

232001–232100 

|-bgcolor=#fefefe
| 232001 ||  || — || September 17, 2001 || Socorro || LINEAR || — || align=right | 1.2 km || 
|-id=002 bgcolor=#d6d6d6
| 232002 ||  || — || September 20, 2001 || Socorro || LINEAR || — || align=right | 4.1 km || 
|-id=003 bgcolor=#d6d6d6
| 232003 ||  || — || September 20, 2001 || Socorro || LINEAR || HYG || align=right | 4.2 km || 
|-id=004 bgcolor=#fefefe
| 232004 ||  || — || September 16, 2001 || Socorro || LINEAR || FLO || align=right | 1.2 km || 
|-id=005 bgcolor=#d6d6d6
| 232005 ||  || — || September 16, 2001 || Socorro || LINEAR || FIR || align=right | 4.2 km || 
|-id=006 bgcolor=#d6d6d6
| 232006 ||  || — || September 16, 2001 || Socorro || LINEAR || — || align=right | 4.7 km || 
|-id=007 bgcolor=#fefefe
| 232007 ||  || — || September 16, 2001 || Socorro || LINEAR || — || align=right data-sort-value="0.94" | 940 m || 
|-id=008 bgcolor=#d6d6d6
| 232008 ||  || — || September 16, 2001 || Socorro || LINEAR || — || align=right | 6.6 km || 
|-id=009 bgcolor=#d6d6d6
| 232009 ||  || — || September 19, 2001 || Socorro || LINEAR || — || align=right | 5.2 km || 
|-id=010 bgcolor=#d6d6d6
| 232010 ||  || — || September 19, 2001 || Socorro || LINEAR || THM || align=right | 4.4 km || 
|-id=011 bgcolor=#fefefe
| 232011 ||  || — || September 19, 2001 || Socorro || LINEAR || — || align=right | 1.0 km || 
|-id=012 bgcolor=#fefefe
| 232012 ||  || — || September 19, 2001 || Socorro || LINEAR || V || align=right data-sort-value="0.73" | 730 m || 
|-id=013 bgcolor=#fefefe
| 232013 ||  || — || September 19, 2001 || Socorro || LINEAR || V || align=right data-sort-value="0.99" | 990 m || 
|-id=014 bgcolor=#fefefe
| 232014 ||  || — || September 19, 2001 || Socorro || LINEAR || FLO || align=right data-sort-value="0.92" | 920 m || 
|-id=015 bgcolor=#fefefe
| 232015 ||  || — || September 19, 2001 || Socorro || LINEAR || FLO || align=right data-sort-value="0.73" | 730 m || 
|-id=016 bgcolor=#FA8072
| 232016 ||  || — || September 24, 2001 || Socorro || LINEAR || H || align=right | 1.1 km || 
|-id=017 bgcolor=#fefefe
| 232017 ||  || — || September 25, 2001 || Desert Eagle || W. K. Y. Yeung || MAS || align=right | 1.1 km || 
|-id=018 bgcolor=#d6d6d6
| 232018 ||  || — || September 20, 2001 || Socorro || LINEAR || HYG || align=right | 4.3 km || 
|-id=019 bgcolor=#E9E9E9
| 232019 ||  || — || September 20, 2001 || Socorro || LINEAR || — || align=right | 1.5 km || 
|-id=020 bgcolor=#fefefe
| 232020 ||  || — || September 23, 2001 || Socorro || LINEAR || — || align=right | 2.3 km || 
|-id=021 bgcolor=#fefefe
| 232021 ||  || — || September 19, 2001 || Socorro || LINEAR || MAS || align=right data-sort-value="0.84" | 840 m || 
|-id=022 bgcolor=#fefefe
| 232022 ||  || — || September 25, 2001 || Socorro || LINEAR || V || align=right data-sort-value="0.94" | 940 m || 
|-id=023 bgcolor=#fefefe
| 232023 ||  || — || October 13, 2001 || Jonathan B. Postel || V. Pozzoli || — || align=right | 3.8 km || 
|-id=024 bgcolor=#fefefe
| 232024 ||  || — || October 14, 2001 || Socorro || LINEAR || — || align=right | 1.2 km || 
|-id=025 bgcolor=#fefefe
| 232025 ||  || — || October 14, 2001 || Socorro || LINEAR || V || align=right | 1.2 km || 
|-id=026 bgcolor=#fefefe
| 232026 ||  || — || October 14, 2001 || Socorro || LINEAR || — || align=right | 1.4 km || 
|-id=027 bgcolor=#E9E9E9
| 232027 ||  || — || October 14, 2001 || Socorro || LINEAR || MIT || align=right | 4.6 km || 
|-id=028 bgcolor=#fefefe
| 232028 ||  || — || October 13, 2001 || Socorro || LINEAR || MAS || align=right data-sort-value="0.98" | 980 m || 
|-id=029 bgcolor=#fefefe
| 232029 ||  || — || October 14, 2001 || Socorro || LINEAR || — || align=right | 1.3 km || 
|-id=030 bgcolor=#fefefe
| 232030 ||  || — || October 14, 2001 || Socorro || LINEAR || FLO || align=right | 1.1 km || 
|-id=031 bgcolor=#fefefe
| 232031 ||  || — || October 14, 2001 || Socorro || LINEAR || — || align=right | 2.6 km || 
|-id=032 bgcolor=#fefefe
| 232032 ||  || — || October 12, 2001 || Haleakala || NEAT || — || align=right | 1.4 km || 
|-id=033 bgcolor=#fefefe
| 232033 ||  || — || October 10, 2001 || Palomar || NEAT || NYS || align=right data-sort-value="0.86" | 860 m || 
|-id=034 bgcolor=#d6d6d6
| 232034 ||  || — || October 10, 2001 || Palomar || NEAT || — || align=right | 3.8 km || 
|-id=035 bgcolor=#fefefe
| 232035 ||  || — || October 15, 2001 || Palomar || NEAT || FLO || align=right | 1.1 km || 
|-id=036 bgcolor=#fefefe
| 232036 ||  || — || October 11, 2001 || Palomar || NEAT || — || align=right | 1.0 km || 
|-id=037 bgcolor=#fefefe
| 232037 ||  || — || October 14, 2001 || Socorro || LINEAR || V || align=right data-sort-value="0.97" | 970 m || 
|-id=038 bgcolor=#fefefe
| 232038 ||  || — || October 14, 2001 || Socorro || LINEAR || — || align=right | 1.3 km || 
|-id=039 bgcolor=#fefefe
| 232039 ||  || — || October 14, 2001 || Socorro || LINEAR || — || align=right | 1.4 km || 
|-id=040 bgcolor=#fefefe
| 232040 ||  || — || October 11, 2001 || Socorro || LINEAR || — || align=right | 1.3 km || 
|-id=041 bgcolor=#fefefe
| 232041 ||  || — || October 14, 2001 || Socorro || LINEAR || — || align=right | 1.2 km || 
|-id=042 bgcolor=#fefefe
| 232042 ||  || — || October 14, 2001 || Anderson Mesa || LONEOS || NYS || align=right | 1.1 km || 
|-id=043 bgcolor=#fefefe
| 232043 ||  || — || October 14, 2001 || Socorro || LINEAR || — || align=right | 1.0 km || 
|-id=044 bgcolor=#d6d6d6
| 232044 ||  || — || October 14, 2001 || Apache Point || SDSS || HYG || align=right | 3.8 km || 
|-id=045 bgcolor=#fefefe
| 232045 ||  || — || October 8, 2001 || Palomar || NEAT || V || align=right data-sort-value="0.72" | 720 m || 
|-id=046 bgcolor=#fefefe
| 232046 ||  || — || October 18, 2001 || Desert Eagle || W. K. Y. Yeung || — || align=right | 1.2 km || 
|-id=047 bgcolor=#fefefe
| 232047 ||  || — || October 17, 2001 || Socorro || LINEAR || NYS || align=right data-sort-value="0.83" | 830 m || 
|-id=048 bgcolor=#E9E9E9
| 232048 ||  || — || October 22, 2001 || Desert Eagle || W. K. Y. Yeung || — || align=right | 2.8 km || 
|-id=049 bgcolor=#fefefe
| 232049 ||  || — || October 24, 2001 || Desert Eagle || W. K. Y. Yeung || NYS || align=right | 1.1 km || 
|-id=050 bgcolor=#fefefe
| 232050 ||  || — || October 18, 2001 || Socorro || LINEAR || V || align=right | 1.1 km || 
|-id=051 bgcolor=#fefefe
| 232051 ||  || — || October 16, 2001 || Socorro || LINEAR || V || align=right | 1.1 km || 
|-id=052 bgcolor=#fefefe
| 232052 ||  || — || October 17, 2001 || Socorro || LINEAR || NYSfast? || align=right data-sort-value="0.76" | 760 m || 
|-id=053 bgcolor=#fefefe
| 232053 ||  || — || October 20, 2001 || Haleakala || NEAT || CHL || align=right | 3.1 km || 
|-id=054 bgcolor=#fefefe
| 232054 ||  || — || October 18, 2001 || Kitt Peak || Spacewatch || MAS || align=right data-sort-value="0.89" | 890 m || 
|-id=055 bgcolor=#fefefe
| 232055 ||  || — || October 21, 2001 || Kitt Peak || Spacewatch || — || align=right data-sort-value="0.89" | 890 m || 
|-id=056 bgcolor=#E9E9E9
| 232056 ||  || — || October 19, 2001 || Haleakala || NEAT || — || align=right | 2.8 km || 
|-id=057 bgcolor=#fefefe
| 232057 ||  || — || October 17, 2001 || Socorro || LINEAR || MAS || align=right data-sort-value="0.85" | 850 m || 
|-id=058 bgcolor=#fefefe
| 232058 ||  || — || October 20, 2001 || Socorro || LINEAR || fast? || align=right data-sort-value="0.94" | 940 m || 
|-id=059 bgcolor=#fefefe
| 232059 ||  || — || October 20, 2001 || Socorro || LINEAR || — || align=right | 1.6 km || 
|-id=060 bgcolor=#fefefe
| 232060 ||  || — || October 22, 2001 || Socorro || LINEAR || — || align=right | 2.5 km || 
|-id=061 bgcolor=#fefefe
| 232061 ||  || — || October 17, 2001 || Socorro || LINEAR || ERI || align=right | 3.1 km || 
|-id=062 bgcolor=#fefefe
| 232062 ||  || — || October 23, 2001 || Socorro || LINEAR || NYS || align=right data-sort-value="0.82" | 820 m || 
|-id=063 bgcolor=#fefefe
| 232063 ||  || — || October 23, 2001 || Socorro || LINEAR || — || align=right | 1.3 km || 
|-id=064 bgcolor=#fefefe
| 232064 ||  || — || October 20, 2001 || Kitt Peak || Spacewatch || NYS || align=right data-sort-value="0.73" | 730 m || 
|-id=065 bgcolor=#d6d6d6
| 232065 ||  || — || October 20, 2001 || Socorro || LINEAR || — || align=right | 4.7 km || 
|-id=066 bgcolor=#fefefe
| 232066 ||  || — || October 21, 2001 || Socorro || LINEAR || — || align=right | 1.4 km || 
|-id=067 bgcolor=#d6d6d6
| 232067 ||  || — || October 21, 2001 || Socorro || LINEAR || HYG || align=right | 4.7 km || 
|-id=068 bgcolor=#fefefe
| 232068 ||  || — || November 10, 2001 || Needville || Needville Obs. || H || align=right data-sort-value="0.65" | 650 m || 
|-id=069 bgcolor=#fefefe
| 232069 ||  || — || November 9, 2001 || Socorro || LINEAR || ERI || align=right | 4.0 km || 
|-id=070 bgcolor=#fefefe
| 232070 ||  || — || November 11, 2001 || Socorro || LINEAR || — || align=right | 1.2 km || 
|-id=071 bgcolor=#fefefe
| 232071 ||  || — || November 9, 2001 || Socorro || LINEAR || NYS || align=right | 1.1 km || 
|-id=072 bgcolor=#fefefe
| 232072 ||  || — || November 9, 2001 || Socorro || LINEAR || NYS || align=right data-sort-value="0.92" | 920 m || 
|-id=073 bgcolor=#fefefe
| 232073 ||  || — || November 9, 2001 || Socorro || LINEAR || NYS || align=right data-sort-value="0.91" | 910 m || 
|-id=074 bgcolor=#fefefe
| 232074 ||  || — || November 9, 2001 || Socorro || LINEAR || V || align=right | 1.2 km || 
|-id=075 bgcolor=#E9E9E9
| 232075 ||  || — || November 9, 2001 || Socorro || LINEAR || — || align=right | 2.8 km || 
|-id=076 bgcolor=#fefefe
| 232076 ||  || — || November 10, 2001 || Socorro || LINEAR || — || align=right | 1.3 km || 
|-id=077 bgcolor=#fefefe
| 232077 ||  || — || November 12, 2001 || Socorro || LINEAR || NYS || align=right data-sort-value="0.98" | 980 m || 
|-id=078 bgcolor=#fefefe
| 232078 ||  || — || November 12, 2001 || Socorro || LINEAR || MAS || align=right data-sort-value="0.93" | 930 m || 
|-id=079 bgcolor=#d6d6d6
| 232079 ||  || — || November 12, 2001 || Socorro || LINEAR || EUP || align=right | 6.6 km || 
|-id=080 bgcolor=#E9E9E9
| 232080 ||  || — || November 12, 2001 || Socorro || LINEAR || — || align=right | 3.3 km || 
|-id=081 bgcolor=#E9E9E9
| 232081 ||  || — || November 17, 2001 || Socorro || LINEAR || — || align=right | 1.9 km || 
|-id=082 bgcolor=#fefefe
| 232082 ||  || — || November 17, 2001 || Socorro || LINEAR || MAS || align=right | 1.0 km || 
|-id=083 bgcolor=#fefefe
| 232083 ||  || — || November 18, 2001 || Socorro || LINEAR || NYS || align=right data-sort-value="0.76" | 760 m || 
|-id=084 bgcolor=#d6d6d6
| 232084 ||  || — || November 19, 2001 || Anderson Mesa || LONEOS || EOS || align=right | 3.0 km || 
|-id=085 bgcolor=#fefefe
| 232085 ||  || — || November 19, 2001 || Kitt Peak || Spacewatch || MAS || align=right data-sort-value="0.90" | 900 m || 
|-id=086 bgcolor=#fefefe
| 232086 ||  || — || November 19, 2001 || Socorro || LINEAR || ERI || align=right | 2.5 km || 
|-id=087 bgcolor=#fefefe
| 232087 ||  || — || November 20, 2001 || Socorro || LINEAR || NYS || align=right | 1.1 km || 
|-id=088 bgcolor=#d6d6d6
| 232088 ||  || — || November 20, 2001 || Socorro || LINEAR || SHU3:2 || align=right | 4.4 km || 
|-id=089 bgcolor=#d6d6d6
| 232089 ||  || — || November 19, 2001 || Anderson Mesa || LONEOS || — || align=right | 5.9 km || 
|-id=090 bgcolor=#E9E9E9
| 232090 ||  || — || December 9, 2001 || Socorro || LINEAR || — || align=right | 1.3 km || 
|-id=091 bgcolor=#FA8072
| 232091 ||  || — || December 9, 2001 || Socorro || LINEAR || H || align=right | 1.1 km || 
|-id=092 bgcolor=#fefefe
| 232092 ||  || — || December 7, 2001 || Socorro || LINEAR || MAS || align=right | 1.2 km || 
|-id=093 bgcolor=#E9E9E9
| 232093 ||  || — || December 9, 2001 || Socorro || LINEAR || — || align=right | 2.3 km || 
|-id=094 bgcolor=#fefefe
| 232094 ||  || — || December 10, 2001 || Socorro || LINEAR || MAS || align=right | 1.0 km || 
|-id=095 bgcolor=#fefefe
| 232095 ||  || — || December 10, 2001 || Socorro || LINEAR || NYS || align=right data-sort-value="0.93" | 930 m || 
|-id=096 bgcolor=#fefefe
| 232096 ||  || — || December 10, 2001 || Socorro || LINEAR || V || align=right data-sort-value="0.99" | 990 m || 
|-id=097 bgcolor=#fefefe
| 232097 ||  || — || December 11, 2001 || Socorro || LINEAR || — || align=right | 1.1 km || 
|-id=098 bgcolor=#E9E9E9
| 232098 ||  || — || December 14, 2001 || Socorro || LINEAR || — || align=right | 2.6 km || 
|-id=099 bgcolor=#fefefe
| 232099 ||  || — || December 14, 2001 || Socorro || LINEAR || — || align=right data-sort-value="0.99" | 990 m || 
|-id=100 bgcolor=#fefefe
| 232100 ||  || — || December 14, 2001 || Socorro || LINEAR || MAS || align=right data-sort-value="0.90" | 900 m || 
|}

232101–232200 

|-bgcolor=#E9E9E9
| 232101 ||  || — || December 14, 2001 || Socorro || LINEAR || — || align=right | 1.1 km || 
|-id=102 bgcolor=#E9E9E9
| 232102 ||  || — || December 14, 2001 || Socorro || LINEAR || — || align=right | 1.6 km || 
|-id=103 bgcolor=#fefefe
| 232103 ||  || — || December 11, 2001 || Socorro || LINEAR || — || align=right | 1.2 km || 
|-id=104 bgcolor=#fefefe
| 232104 ||  || — || December 11, 2001 || Socorro || LINEAR || — || align=right | 1.3 km || 
|-id=105 bgcolor=#fefefe
| 232105 ||  || — || December 14, 2001 || Socorro || LINEAR || H || align=right data-sort-value="0.70" | 700 m || 
|-id=106 bgcolor=#fefefe
| 232106 ||  || — || December 15, 2001 || Socorro || LINEAR || NYS || align=right data-sort-value="0.80" | 800 m || 
|-id=107 bgcolor=#E9E9E9
| 232107 ||  || — || December 15, 2001 || Socorro || LINEAR || — || align=right | 1.5 km || 
|-id=108 bgcolor=#fefefe
| 232108 ||  || — || December 15, 2001 || Socorro || LINEAR || MAS || align=right | 1.0 km || 
|-id=109 bgcolor=#fefefe
| 232109 ||  || — || December 14, 2001 || Socorro || LINEAR || — || align=right | 1.1 km || 
|-id=110 bgcolor=#fefefe
| 232110 ||  || — || December 8, 2001 || Anderson Mesa || LONEOS || — || align=right | 1.1 km || 
|-id=111 bgcolor=#E9E9E9
| 232111 ||  || — || December 9, 2001 || Socorro || LINEAR || — || align=right | 2.2 km || 
|-id=112 bgcolor=#fefefe
| 232112 ||  || — || December 17, 2001 || Socorro || LINEAR || — || align=right | 1.1 km || 
|-id=113 bgcolor=#E9E9E9
| 232113 ||  || — || December 18, 2001 || Socorro || LINEAR || — || align=right | 1.5 km || 
|-id=114 bgcolor=#fefefe
| 232114 ||  || — || December 18, 2001 || Socorro || LINEAR || NYS || align=right | 1.3 km || 
|-id=115 bgcolor=#fefefe
| 232115 ||  || — || December 18, 2001 || Socorro || LINEAR || MAS || align=right | 1.0 km || 
|-id=116 bgcolor=#fefefe
| 232116 ||  || — || December 18, 2001 || Socorro || LINEAR || — || align=right | 1.4 km || 
|-id=117 bgcolor=#E9E9E9
| 232117 ||  || — || December 18, 2001 || Socorro || LINEAR || — || align=right | 3.4 km || 
|-id=118 bgcolor=#fefefe
| 232118 ||  || — || December 17, 2001 || Socorro || LINEAR || — || align=right | 2.5 km || 
|-id=119 bgcolor=#fefefe
| 232119 ||  || — || December 17, 2001 || Socorro || LINEAR || — || align=right | 1.1 km || 
|-id=120 bgcolor=#fefefe
| 232120 ||  || — || December 18, 2001 || Palomar || NEAT || — || align=right | 1.6 km || 
|-id=121 bgcolor=#E9E9E9
| 232121 ||  || — || January 8, 2002 || Palomar || NEAT || — || align=right | 2.4 km || 
|-id=122 bgcolor=#fefefe
| 232122 ||  || — || January 9, 2002 || Socorro || LINEAR || — || align=right | 1.2 km || 
|-id=123 bgcolor=#fefefe
| 232123 ||  || — || January 9, 2002 || Socorro || LINEAR || — || align=right | 1.2 km || 
|-id=124 bgcolor=#fefefe
| 232124 ||  || — || January 9, 2002 || Socorro || LINEAR || V || align=right | 1.1 km || 
|-id=125 bgcolor=#fefefe
| 232125 ||  || — || January 9, 2002 || Socorro || LINEAR || — || align=right | 2.5 km || 
|-id=126 bgcolor=#E9E9E9
| 232126 ||  || — || January 9, 2002 || Socorro || LINEAR || — || align=right | 3.8 km || 
|-id=127 bgcolor=#fefefe
| 232127 ||  || — || January 9, 2002 || Socorro || LINEAR || — || align=right | 1.3 km || 
|-id=128 bgcolor=#fefefe
| 232128 ||  || — || January 9, 2002 || Socorro || LINEAR || — || align=right | 1.4 km || 
|-id=129 bgcolor=#E9E9E9
| 232129 ||  || — || January 13, 2002 || Socorro || LINEAR || — || align=right | 2.6 km || 
|-id=130 bgcolor=#fefefe
| 232130 ||  || — || January 14, 2002 || Socorro || LINEAR || — || align=right | 2.9 km || 
|-id=131 bgcolor=#fefefe
| 232131 ||  || — || January 7, 2002 || Anderson Mesa || LONEOS || — || align=right | 1.4 km || 
|-id=132 bgcolor=#fefefe
| 232132 ||  || — || January 8, 2002 || Haleakala || NEAT || H || align=right data-sort-value="0.87" | 870 m || 
|-id=133 bgcolor=#E9E9E9
| 232133 ||  || — || January 18, 2002 || Anderson Mesa || LONEOS || — || align=right | 3.0 km || 
|-id=134 bgcolor=#fefefe
| 232134 ||  || — || January 23, 2002 || Socorro || LINEAR || H || align=right data-sort-value="0.62" | 620 m || 
|-id=135 bgcolor=#fefefe
| 232135 ||  || — || January 20, 2002 || Anderson Mesa || LONEOS || V || align=right | 1.2 km || 
|-id=136 bgcolor=#E9E9E9
| 232136 ||  || — || January 19, 2002 || Anderson Mesa || LONEOS || — || align=right | 1.3 km || 
|-id=137 bgcolor=#fefefe
| 232137 ||  || — || February 2, 2002 || Cima Ekar || ADAS || H || align=right data-sort-value="0.70" | 700 m || 
|-id=138 bgcolor=#fefefe
| 232138 ||  || — || February 3, 2002 || Palomar || NEAT || — || align=right | 1.6 km || 
|-id=139 bgcolor=#fefefe
| 232139 ||  || — || February 3, 2002 || Haleakala || NEAT || H || align=right data-sort-value="0.83" | 830 m || 
|-id=140 bgcolor=#E9E9E9
| 232140 ||  || — || February 1, 2002 || Socorro || LINEAR || BAR || align=right | 1.6 km || 
|-id=141 bgcolor=#E9E9E9
| 232141 ||  || — || February 8, 2002 || Desert Eagle || W. K. Y. Yeung || — || align=right | 1.4 km || 
|-id=142 bgcolor=#fefefe
| 232142 ||  || — || February 6, 2002 || Socorro || LINEAR || — || align=right | 2.2 km || 
|-id=143 bgcolor=#fefefe
| 232143 ||  || — || February 10, 2002 || Socorro || LINEAR || H || align=right data-sort-value="0.92" | 920 m || 
|-id=144 bgcolor=#E9E9E9
| 232144 ||  || — || February 6, 2002 || Socorro || LINEAR || — || align=right | 1.2 km || 
|-id=145 bgcolor=#E9E9E9
| 232145 ||  || — || February 8, 2002 || Palomar || NEAT || MIT || align=right | 4.3 km || 
|-id=146 bgcolor=#E9E9E9
| 232146 ||  || — || February 7, 2002 || Socorro || LINEAR || — || align=right | 1.2 km || 
|-id=147 bgcolor=#E9E9E9
| 232147 ||  || — || February 10, 2002 || Socorro || LINEAR || AST || align=right | 2.5 km || 
|-id=148 bgcolor=#fefefe
| 232148 ||  || — || February 10, 2002 || Socorro || LINEAR || V || align=right data-sort-value="0.99" | 990 m || 
|-id=149 bgcolor=#fefefe
| 232149 ||  || — || February 10, 2002 || Socorro || LINEAR || — || align=right | 2.9 km || 
|-id=150 bgcolor=#fefefe
| 232150 ||  || — || February 10, 2002 || Socorro || LINEAR || — || align=right | 3.6 km || 
|-id=151 bgcolor=#E9E9E9
| 232151 ||  || — || February 10, 2002 || Socorro || LINEAR || POS || align=right | 5.9 km || 
|-id=152 bgcolor=#fefefe
| 232152 ||  || — || February 10, 2002 || Socorro || LINEAR || — || align=right | 1.3 km || 
|-id=153 bgcolor=#E9E9E9
| 232153 ||  || — || February 10, 2002 || Socorro || LINEAR || — || align=right | 1.4 km || 
|-id=154 bgcolor=#E9E9E9
| 232154 ||  || — || February 10, 2002 || Socorro || LINEAR || — || align=right | 2.5 km || 
|-id=155 bgcolor=#E9E9E9
| 232155 ||  || — || February 10, 2002 || Socorro || LINEAR || — || align=right | 1.9 km || 
|-id=156 bgcolor=#E9E9E9
| 232156 ||  || — || February 10, 2002 || Socorro || LINEAR || — || align=right | 1.2 km || 
|-id=157 bgcolor=#E9E9E9
| 232157 ||  || — || February 11, 2002 || Socorro || LINEAR || — || align=right | 2.3 km || 
|-id=158 bgcolor=#E9E9E9
| 232158 ||  || — || February 13, 2002 || Socorro || LINEAR || — || align=right | 1.6 km || 
|-id=159 bgcolor=#E9E9E9
| 232159 ||  || — || February 4, 2002 || Anderson Mesa || LONEOS || RAF || align=right | 1.7 km || 
|-id=160 bgcolor=#E9E9E9
| 232160 ||  || — || February 6, 2002 || Anderson Mesa || LONEOS || — || align=right | 1.8 km || 
|-id=161 bgcolor=#E9E9E9
| 232161 ||  || — || February 7, 2002 || Haleakala || NEAT || — || align=right | 2.3 km || 
|-id=162 bgcolor=#E9E9E9
| 232162 ||  || — || February 10, 2002 || Socorro || LINEAR || — || align=right | 1.7 km || 
|-id=163 bgcolor=#E9E9E9
| 232163 ||  || — || February 10, 2002 || Socorro || LINEAR || — || align=right | 1.6 km || 
|-id=164 bgcolor=#E9E9E9
| 232164 ||  || — || February 10, 2002 || Anderson Mesa || LONEOS || JUN || align=right | 2.6 km || 
|-id=165 bgcolor=#d6d6d6
| 232165 ||  || — || February 10, 2002 || Socorro || LINEAR || SHU3:2 || align=right | 5.9 km || 
|-id=166 bgcolor=#fefefe
| 232166 ||  || — || February 21, 2002 || Socorro || LINEAR || H || align=right data-sort-value="0.87" | 870 m || 
|-id=167 bgcolor=#fefefe
| 232167 ||  || — || February 19, 2002 || Socorro || LINEAR || H || align=right | 1.1 km || 
|-id=168 bgcolor=#E9E9E9
| 232168 ||  || — || March 10, 2002 || Haleakala || NEAT || MAR || align=right | 1.4 km || 
|-id=169 bgcolor=#E9E9E9
| 232169 ||  || — || March 6, 2002 || Palomar || NEAT || — || align=right | 1.5 km || 
|-id=170 bgcolor=#E9E9E9
| 232170 ||  || — || March 10, 2002 || Haleakala || NEAT || — || align=right | 1.5 km || 
|-id=171 bgcolor=#E9E9E9
| 232171 ||  || — || March 5, 2002 || Kitt Peak || Spacewatch || — || align=right | 1.9 km || 
|-id=172 bgcolor=#fefefe
| 232172 ||  || — || March 9, 2002 || Socorro || LINEAR || — || align=right | 1.7 km || 
|-id=173 bgcolor=#E9E9E9
| 232173 ||  || — || March 12, 2002 || Kitt Peak || Spacewatch || — || align=right | 1.1 km || 
|-id=174 bgcolor=#E9E9E9
| 232174 ||  || — || March 13, 2002 || Socorro || LINEAR || — || align=right | 2.3 km || 
|-id=175 bgcolor=#E9E9E9
| 232175 ||  || — || March 9, 2002 || Socorro || LINEAR || — || align=right | 1.8 km || 
|-id=176 bgcolor=#E9E9E9
| 232176 ||  || — || March 13, 2002 || Socorro || LINEAR || — || align=right | 1.3 km || 
|-id=177 bgcolor=#E9E9E9
| 232177 ||  || — || March 13, 2002 || Socorro || LINEAR || — || align=right | 1.4 km || 
|-id=178 bgcolor=#E9E9E9
| 232178 ||  || — || March 13, 2002 || Socorro || LINEAR || — || align=right | 2.6 km || 
|-id=179 bgcolor=#E9E9E9
| 232179 ||  || — || March 13, 2002 || Socorro || LINEAR || KON || align=right | 3.6 km || 
|-id=180 bgcolor=#E9E9E9
| 232180 ||  || — || March 13, 2002 || Socorro || LINEAR || MAR || align=right | 1.7 km || 
|-id=181 bgcolor=#E9E9E9
| 232181 ||  || — || March 13, 2002 || Socorro || LINEAR || — || align=right | 2.9 km || 
|-id=182 bgcolor=#E9E9E9
| 232182 ||  || — || March 13, 2002 || Socorro || LINEAR || — || align=right | 1.8 km || 
|-id=183 bgcolor=#E9E9E9
| 232183 ||  || — || March 9, 2002 || Socorro || LINEAR || — || align=right | 2.4 km || 
|-id=184 bgcolor=#E9E9E9
| 232184 ||  || — || March 6, 2002 || Palomar || NEAT || — || align=right | 4.5 km || 
|-id=185 bgcolor=#E9E9E9
| 232185 ||  || — || March 12, 2002 || Palomar || NEAT || — || align=right | 1.4 km || 
|-id=186 bgcolor=#E9E9E9
| 232186 ||  || — || March 12, 2002 || Kitt Peak || Spacewatch || — || align=right | 1.1 km || 
|-id=187 bgcolor=#E9E9E9
| 232187 ||  || — || March 12, 2002 || Palomar || NEAT || — || align=right | 1.0 km || 
|-id=188 bgcolor=#E9E9E9
| 232188 ||  || — || March 12, 2002 || Kitt Peak || Spacewatch || — || align=right | 1.9 km || 
|-id=189 bgcolor=#E9E9E9
| 232189 ||  || — || March 20, 2002 || Desert Eagle || W. K. Y. Yeung || — || align=right | 5.1 km || 
|-id=190 bgcolor=#d6d6d6
| 232190 ||  || — || March 17, 2002 || Kitt Peak || Spacewatch || CHA || align=right | 3.0 km || 
|-id=191 bgcolor=#E9E9E9
| 232191 ||  || — || March 19, 2002 || Palomar || NEAT || — || align=right | 2.8 km || 
|-id=192 bgcolor=#E9E9E9
| 232192 ||  || — || March 31, 2002 || Palomar || NEAT || — || align=right | 1.7 km || 
|-id=193 bgcolor=#E9E9E9
| 232193 ||  || — || March 31, 2002 || Palomar || NEAT || — || align=right | 1.7 km || 
|-id=194 bgcolor=#E9E9E9
| 232194 || 2002 GJ || — || April 2, 2002 || Palomar || NEAT || — || align=right | 1.7 km || 
|-id=195 bgcolor=#fefefe
| 232195 ||  || — || April 4, 2002 || Palomar || NEAT || H || align=right | 1.2 km || 
|-id=196 bgcolor=#E9E9E9
| 232196 ||  || — || April 15, 2002 || Socorro || LINEAR || — || align=right | 4.0 km || 
|-id=197 bgcolor=#E9E9E9
| 232197 ||  || — || April 5, 2002 || Palomar || NEAT || BRG || align=right | 2.0 km || 
|-id=198 bgcolor=#E9E9E9
| 232198 ||  || — || April 8, 2002 || Palomar || NEAT || BRU || align=right | 4.7 km || 
|-id=199 bgcolor=#E9E9E9
| 232199 ||  || — || April 8, 2002 || Palomar || NEAT || — || align=right | 2.4 km || 
|-id=200 bgcolor=#E9E9E9
| 232200 ||  || — || April 8, 2002 || Palomar || NEAT || — || align=right | 1.1 km || 
|}

232201–232300 

|-bgcolor=#E9E9E9
| 232201 ||  || — || April 8, 2002 || Kitt Peak || Spacewatch || — || align=right | 1.2 km || 
|-id=202 bgcolor=#E9E9E9
| 232202 ||  || — || April 8, 2002 || Palomar || NEAT || — || align=right | 1.9 km || 
|-id=203 bgcolor=#E9E9E9
| 232203 ||  || — || April 10, 2002 || Socorro || LINEAR || — || align=right | 1.7 km || 
|-id=204 bgcolor=#E9E9E9
| 232204 ||  || — || April 10, 2002 || Socorro || LINEAR || — || align=right | 1.6 km || 
|-id=205 bgcolor=#E9E9E9
| 232205 ||  || — || April 11, 2002 || Anderson Mesa || LONEOS || — || align=right | 4.0 km || 
|-id=206 bgcolor=#E9E9E9
| 232206 ||  || — || April 11, 2002 || Socorro || LINEAR || — || align=right | 1.7 km || 
|-id=207 bgcolor=#E9E9E9
| 232207 ||  || — || April 10, 2002 || Socorro || LINEAR || — || align=right | 2.3 km || 
|-id=208 bgcolor=#E9E9E9
| 232208 ||  || — || April 11, 2002 || Palomar || NEAT || MAR || align=right | 2.6 km || 
|-id=209 bgcolor=#E9E9E9
| 232209 ||  || — || April 13, 2002 || Palomar || NEAT || — || align=right | 2.2 km || 
|-id=210 bgcolor=#E9E9E9
| 232210 ||  || — || April 11, 2002 || Palomar || NEAT || — || align=right | 3.7 km || 
|-id=211 bgcolor=#E9E9E9
| 232211 ||  || — || April 13, 2002 || Palomar || NEAT || — || align=right | 1.8 km || 
|-id=212 bgcolor=#E9E9E9
| 232212 ||  || — || April 15, 2002 || Anderson Mesa || LONEOS || ADE || align=right | 3.7 km || 
|-id=213 bgcolor=#E9E9E9
| 232213 ||  || — || April 9, 2002 || Socorro || LINEAR || — || align=right | 1.4 km || 
|-id=214 bgcolor=#E9E9E9
| 232214 ||  || — || April 22, 2002 || Palomar || NEAT || — || align=right | 2.0 km || 
|-id=215 bgcolor=#E9E9E9
| 232215 ||  || — || April 22, 2002 || Socorro || LINEAR || — || align=right | 4.1 km || 
|-id=216 bgcolor=#E9E9E9
| 232216 ||  || — || April 22, 2002 || Socorro || LINEAR || — || align=right | 3.2 km || 
|-id=217 bgcolor=#E9E9E9
| 232217 ||  || — || April 22, 2002 || Socorro || LINEAR || — || align=right | 4.3 km || 
|-id=218 bgcolor=#E9E9E9
| 232218 ||  || — || April 17, 2002 || Socorro || LINEAR || — || align=right | 1.5 km || 
|-id=219 bgcolor=#E9E9E9
| 232219 ||  || — || May 7, 2002 || Kitt Peak || Spacewatch || — || align=right | 1.5 km || 
|-id=220 bgcolor=#fefefe
| 232220 ||  || — || May 9, 2002 || Socorro || LINEAR || NYS || align=right data-sort-value="0.84" | 840 m || 
|-id=221 bgcolor=#E9E9E9
| 232221 ||  || — || May 13, 2002 || Palomar || NEAT || — || align=right | 3.6 km || 
|-id=222 bgcolor=#E9E9E9
| 232222 ||  || — || May 13, 2002 || Palomar || NEAT || — || align=right | 2.2 km || 
|-id=223 bgcolor=#E9E9E9
| 232223 ||  || — || May 5, 2002 || Palomar || NEAT || — || align=right | 1.7 km || 
|-id=224 bgcolor=#E9E9E9
| 232224 ||  || — || May 5, 2002 || Palomar || NEAT || — || align=right | 2.9 km || 
|-id=225 bgcolor=#E9E9E9
| 232225 ||  || — || May 5, 2002 || Palomar || NEAT || EUN || align=right | 2.3 km || 
|-id=226 bgcolor=#E9E9E9
| 232226 ||  || — || May 9, 2002 || Palomar || NEAT || — || align=right | 3.2 km || 
|-id=227 bgcolor=#E9E9E9
| 232227 ||  || — || May 9, 2002 || Palomar || NEAT || — || align=right | 1.7 km || 
|-id=228 bgcolor=#E9E9E9
| 232228 ||  || — || May 30, 2002 || Palomar || NEAT || — || align=right | 3.0 km || 
|-id=229 bgcolor=#E9E9E9
| 232229 ||  || — || May 30, 2002 || Palomar || NEAT || — || align=right | 2.3 km || 
|-id=230 bgcolor=#E9E9E9
| 232230 ||  || — || June 1, 2002 || Socorro || LINEAR || — || align=right | 1.9 km || 
|-id=231 bgcolor=#E9E9E9
| 232231 ||  || — || June 6, 2002 || Socorro || LINEAR || MIT || align=right | 3.4 km || 
|-id=232 bgcolor=#E9E9E9
| 232232 ||  || — || June 9, 2002 || Palomar || NEAT || — || align=right | 3.5 km || 
|-id=233 bgcolor=#E9E9E9
| 232233 ||  || — || June 2, 2002 || Palomar || NEAT || — || align=right | 3.1 km || 
|-id=234 bgcolor=#d6d6d6
| 232234 ||  || — || July 10, 2002 || Campo Imperatore || CINEOS || — || align=right | 4.2 km || 
|-id=235 bgcolor=#d6d6d6
| 232235 ||  || — || July 5, 2002 || Socorro || LINEAR || — || align=right | 4.2 km || 
|-id=236 bgcolor=#E9E9E9
| 232236 ||  || — || July 9, 2002 || Socorro || LINEAR || — || align=right | 4.1 km || 
|-id=237 bgcolor=#E9E9E9
| 232237 ||  || — || July 9, 2002 || Socorro || LINEAR || — || align=right | 1.8 km || 
|-id=238 bgcolor=#E9E9E9
| 232238 ||  || — || July 12, 2002 || Palomar || NEAT || JUN || align=right | 1.8 km || 
|-id=239 bgcolor=#d6d6d6
| 232239 ||  || — || July 4, 2002 || Palomar || NEAT || — || align=right | 3.1 km || 
|-id=240 bgcolor=#d6d6d6
| 232240 ||  || — || July 9, 2002 || Palomar || NEAT || TEL || align=right | 1.5 km || 
|-id=241 bgcolor=#d6d6d6
| 232241 ||  || — || July 20, 2002 || Palomar || NEAT || — || align=right | 6.2 km || 
|-id=242 bgcolor=#d6d6d6
| 232242 ||  || — || July 18, 2002 || Palomar || NEAT || EUP || align=right | 6.9 km || 
|-id=243 bgcolor=#d6d6d6
| 232243 ||  || — || July 22, 2002 || Palomar || NEAT || — || align=right | 3.0 km || 
|-id=244 bgcolor=#d6d6d6
| 232244 ||  || — || August 3, 2002 || Palomar || NEAT || — || align=right | 3.9 km || 
|-id=245 bgcolor=#d6d6d6
| 232245 ||  || — || August 4, 2002 || Palomar || NEAT || — || align=right | 5.6 km || 
|-id=246 bgcolor=#d6d6d6
| 232246 ||  || — || August 6, 2002 || Palomar || NEAT || CHA || align=right | 3.0 km || 
|-id=247 bgcolor=#d6d6d6
| 232247 ||  || — || August 6, 2002 || Palomar || NEAT || EOS || align=right | 2.6 km || 
|-id=248 bgcolor=#E9E9E9
| 232248 ||  || — || August 6, 2002 || Palomar || NEAT || — || align=right | 3.5 km || 
|-id=249 bgcolor=#d6d6d6
| 232249 ||  || — || August 6, 2002 || Palomar || NEAT || — || align=right | 4.6 km || 
|-id=250 bgcolor=#d6d6d6
| 232250 ||  || — || August 6, 2002 || Palomar || NEAT || — || align=right | 4.8 km || 
|-id=251 bgcolor=#d6d6d6
| 232251 ||  || — || August 8, 2002 || Palomar || NEAT || THM || align=right | 3.0 km || 
|-id=252 bgcolor=#d6d6d6
| 232252 ||  || — || August 5, 2002 || Campo Imperatore || CINEOS || EUP || align=right | 5.5 km || 
|-id=253 bgcolor=#E9E9E9
| 232253 ||  || — || August 11, 2002 || Socorro || LINEAR || AER || align=right | 3.0 km || 
|-id=254 bgcolor=#d6d6d6
| 232254 ||  || — || August 13, 2002 || Palomar || NEAT || EOS || align=right | 2.6 km || 
|-id=255 bgcolor=#fefefe
| 232255 ||  || — || August 13, 2002 || Anderson Mesa || LONEOS || PHO || align=right | 1.6 km || 
|-id=256 bgcolor=#E9E9E9
| 232256 ||  || — || August 6, 2002 || Palomar || NEAT || — || align=right | 2.7 km || 
|-id=257 bgcolor=#d6d6d6
| 232257 ||  || — || August 14, 2002 || Socorro || LINEAR || — || align=right | 3.8 km || 
|-id=258 bgcolor=#E9E9E9
| 232258 ||  || — || August 15, 2002 || Anderson Mesa || LONEOS || — || align=right | 3.2 km || 
|-id=259 bgcolor=#d6d6d6
| 232259 ||  || — || August 10, 2002 || Cerro Tololo || M. W. Buie || — || align=right | 3.9 km || 
|-id=260 bgcolor=#d6d6d6
| 232260 ||  || — || August 8, 2002 || Palomar || S. F. Hönig || — || align=right | 3.2 km || 
|-id=261 bgcolor=#E9E9E9
| 232261 ||  || — || August 8, 2002 || Palomar || S. F. Hönig || HOF || align=right | 4.7 km || 
|-id=262 bgcolor=#E9E9E9
| 232262 ||  || — || August 8, 2002 || Palomar || S. F. Hönig || AGN || align=right | 1.7 km || 
|-id=263 bgcolor=#d6d6d6
| 232263 ||  || — || August 26, 2002 || Palomar || NEAT || EUP || align=right | 5.8 km || 
|-id=264 bgcolor=#d6d6d6
| 232264 ||  || — || August 28, 2002 || Palomar || NEAT || — || align=right | 5.6 km || 
|-id=265 bgcolor=#d6d6d6
| 232265 ||  || — || August 27, 2002 || Palomar || NEAT || — || align=right | 3.1 km || 
|-id=266 bgcolor=#E9E9E9
| 232266 ||  || — || August 30, 2002 || Kitt Peak || Spacewatch || — || align=right | 3.0 km || 
|-id=267 bgcolor=#d6d6d6
| 232267 ||  || — || August 29, 2002 || Palomar || R. Matson || — || align=right | 3.6 km || 
|-id=268 bgcolor=#d6d6d6
| 232268 ||  || — || August 16, 2002 || Palomar || A. Lowe || BRA || align=right | 2.5 km || 
|-id=269 bgcolor=#d6d6d6
| 232269 ||  || — || August 17, 2002 || Palomar || NEAT || — || align=right | 3.0 km || 
|-id=270 bgcolor=#d6d6d6
| 232270 ||  || — || August 16, 2002 || Palomar || NEAT || — || align=right | 2.5 km || 
|-id=271 bgcolor=#d6d6d6
| 232271 ||  || — || August 19, 2002 || Palomar || NEAT || EOS || align=right | 2.6 km || 
|-id=272 bgcolor=#d6d6d6
| 232272 ||  || — || August 19, 2002 || Palomar || NEAT || TEL || align=right | 1.9 km || 
|-id=273 bgcolor=#d6d6d6
| 232273 ||  || — || August 17, 2002 || Palomar || NEAT || — || align=right | 4.5 km || 
|-id=274 bgcolor=#d6d6d6
| 232274 ||  || — || August 19, 2002 || Palomar || NEAT || — || align=right | 4.1 km || 
|-id=275 bgcolor=#d6d6d6
| 232275 ||  || — || August 18, 2002 || Palomar || NEAT || KOR || align=right | 1.8 km || 
|-id=276 bgcolor=#d6d6d6
| 232276 ||  || — || August 17, 2002 || Palomar || NEAT || THM || align=right | 2.4 km || 
|-id=277 bgcolor=#d6d6d6
| 232277 || 2002 RW || — || September 1, 2002 || Haleakala || NEAT || — || align=right | 6.1 km || 
|-id=278 bgcolor=#fefefe
| 232278 ||  || — || September 4, 2002 || Anderson Mesa || LONEOS || FLO || align=right data-sort-value="0.75" | 750 m || 
|-id=279 bgcolor=#E9E9E9
| 232279 ||  || — || September 5, 2002 || Socorro || LINEAR || — || align=right | 3.7 km || 
|-id=280 bgcolor=#d6d6d6
| 232280 ||  || — || September 5, 2002 || Anderson Mesa || LONEOS || — || align=right | 6.0 km || 
|-id=281 bgcolor=#d6d6d6
| 232281 ||  || — || September 5, 2002 || Socorro || LINEAR || MEL || align=right | 5.1 km || 
|-id=282 bgcolor=#E9E9E9
| 232282 ||  || — || September 5, 2002 || Socorro || LINEAR || — || align=right | 2.5 km || 
|-id=283 bgcolor=#E9E9E9
| 232283 ||  || — || September 5, 2002 || Socorro || LINEAR || MRX || align=right | 1.7 km || 
|-id=284 bgcolor=#E9E9E9
| 232284 ||  || — || September 10, 2002 || Palomar || NEAT || — || align=right | 6.7 km || 
|-id=285 bgcolor=#E9E9E9
| 232285 ||  || — || September 11, 2002 || Palomar || NEAT || JUN || align=right | 4.4 km || 
|-id=286 bgcolor=#d6d6d6
| 232286 ||  || — || September 10, 2002 || Palomar || NEAT || EUP || align=right | 5.5 km || 
|-id=287 bgcolor=#d6d6d6
| 232287 ||  || — || September 10, 2002 || Palomar || NEAT || EOS || align=right | 3.0 km || 
|-id=288 bgcolor=#d6d6d6
| 232288 ||  || — || September 13, 2002 || Palomar || NEAT || — || align=right | 4.3 km || 
|-id=289 bgcolor=#d6d6d6
| 232289 ||  || — || September 14, 2002 || Kitt Peak || Spacewatch || HYG || align=right | 4.6 km || 
|-id=290 bgcolor=#E9E9E9
| 232290 ||  || — || September 14, 2002 || Kitt Peak || Spacewatch || — || align=right | 3.5 km || 
|-id=291 bgcolor=#fefefe
| 232291 ||  || — || September 13, 2002 || Goodricke-Pigott || R. A. Tucker || — || align=right data-sort-value="0.74" | 740 m || 
|-id=292 bgcolor=#d6d6d6
| 232292 ||  || — || September 12, 2002 || Palomar || NEAT || — || align=right | 6.7 km || 
|-id=293 bgcolor=#d6d6d6
| 232293 ||  || — || September 12, 2002 || Palomar || NEAT || — || align=right | 4.6 km || 
|-id=294 bgcolor=#d6d6d6
| 232294 ||  || — || September 13, 2002 || Palomar || NEAT || THM || align=right | 3.3 km || 
|-id=295 bgcolor=#d6d6d6
| 232295 ||  || — || September 13, 2002 || Haleakala || NEAT || KOR || align=right | 2.1 km || 
|-id=296 bgcolor=#d6d6d6
| 232296 ||  || — || September 11, 2002 || Palomar || M. White, M. Collins || — || align=right | 3.9 km || 
|-id=297 bgcolor=#d6d6d6
| 232297 ||  || — || September 14, 2002 || Palomar || R. Matson || KOR || align=right | 1.8 km || 
|-id=298 bgcolor=#d6d6d6
| 232298 ||  || — || September 12, 2002 || Palomar || R. Matson || — || align=right | 3.4 km || 
|-id=299 bgcolor=#fefefe
| 232299 ||  || — || September 12, 2002 || Palomar || NEAT || — || align=right data-sort-value="0.73" | 730 m || 
|-id=300 bgcolor=#d6d6d6
| 232300 ||  || — || September 1, 2002 || Palomar || NEAT || KOR || align=right | 1.7 km || 
|}

232301–232400 

|-bgcolor=#d6d6d6
| 232301 ||  || — || September 14, 2002 || Palomar || NEAT || KOR || align=right | 1.7 km || 
|-id=302 bgcolor=#d6d6d6
| 232302 ||  || — || September 9, 2002 || Palomar || NEAT || — || align=right | 4.7 km || 
|-id=303 bgcolor=#d6d6d6
| 232303 ||  || — || September 13, 2002 || Palomar || NEAT || EOS || align=right | 2.2 km || 
|-id=304 bgcolor=#d6d6d6
| 232304 ||  || — || September 5, 2002 || Apache Point || SDSS || HYG || align=right | 3.9 km || 
|-id=305 bgcolor=#d6d6d6
| 232305 ||  || — || September 1, 2002 || Palomar || NEAT || — || align=right | 2.7 km || 
|-id=306 bgcolor=#fefefe
| 232306 Bekuška ||  ||  || September 14, 2002 || Palomar || NEAT || — || align=right data-sort-value="0.85" | 850 m || 
|-id=307 bgcolor=#d6d6d6
| 232307 ||  || — || September 27, 2002 || Palomar || NEAT || KOR || align=right | 2.4 km || 
|-id=308 bgcolor=#d6d6d6
| 232308 ||  || — || October 2, 2002 || Socorro || LINEAR || — || align=right | 4.3 km || 
|-id=309 bgcolor=#fefefe
| 232309 ||  || — || October 2, 2002 || Socorro || LINEAR || — || align=right data-sort-value="0.75" | 750 m || 
|-id=310 bgcolor=#d6d6d6
| 232310 ||  || — || October 2, 2002 || Socorro || LINEAR || — || align=right | 4.3 km || 
|-id=311 bgcolor=#fefefe
| 232311 ||  || — || October 2, 2002 || Socorro || LINEAR || — || align=right | 1.1 km || 
|-id=312 bgcolor=#fefefe
| 232312 ||  || — || October 3, 2002 || Palomar || NEAT || — || align=right | 2.1 km || 
|-id=313 bgcolor=#d6d6d6
| 232313 ||  || — || October 1, 2002 || Anderson Mesa || LONEOS || — || align=right | 4.4 km || 
|-id=314 bgcolor=#d6d6d6
| 232314 ||  || — || October 3, 2002 || Palomar || NEAT || — || align=right | 4.7 km || 
|-id=315 bgcolor=#d6d6d6
| 232315 ||  || — || October 3, 2002 || Socorro || LINEAR || HYG || align=right | 3.4 km || 
|-id=316 bgcolor=#d6d6d6
| 232316 ||  || — || October 3, 2002 || Socorro || LINEAR || THM || align=right | 2.8 km || 
|-id=317 bgcolor=#d6d6d6
| 232317 ||  || — || October 4, 2002 || Socorro || LINEAR || HYG || align=right | 3.8 km || 
|-id=318 bgcolor=#d6d6d6
| 232318 ||  || — || October 4, 2002 || Socorro || LINEAR || EUP || align=right | 6.4 km || 
|-id=319 bgcolor=#d6d6d6
| 232319 ||  || — || October 4, 2002 || Anderson Mesa || LONEOS || EOS || align=right | 5.7 km || 
|-id=320 bgcolor=#d6d6d6
| 232320 ||  || — || October 3, 2002 || Palomar || NEAT || EOS || align=right | 2.8 km || 
|-id=321 bgcolor=#d6d6d6
| 232321 ||  || — || October 3, 2002 || Palomar || NEAT || — || align=right | 4.8 km || 
|-id=322 bgcolor=#d6d6d6
| 232322 ||  || — || October 4, 2002 || Palomar || NEAT || EOS || align=right | 2.8 km || 
|-id=323 bgcolor=#fefefe
| 232323 ||  || — || October 4, 2002 || Anderson Mesa || LONEOS || — || align=right | 1.4 km || 
|-id=324 bgcolor=#d6d6d6
| 232324 ||  || — || October 3, 2002 || Socorro || LINEAR || — || align=right | 5.5 km || 
|-id=325 bgcolor=#d6d6d6
| 232325 ||  || — || October 5, 2002 || Palomar || NEAT || — || align=right | 3.1 km || 
|-id=326 bgcolor=#d6d6d6
| 232326 ||  || — || October 5, 2002 || Palomar || NEAT || HYG || align=right | 3.5 km || 
|-id=327 bgcolor=#d6d6d6
| 232327 ||  || — || October 5, 2002 || Palomar || NEAT || TIR || align=right | 4.2 km || 
|-id=328 bgcolor=#d6d6d6
| 232328 ||  || — || October 3, 2002 || Palomar || NEAT || — || align=right | 5.9 km || 
|-id=329 bgcolor=#d6d6d6
| 232329 ||  || — || October 3, 2002 || Palomar || NEAT || — || align=right | 4.9 km || 
|-id=330 bgcolor=#E9E9E9
| 232330 ||  || — || October 4, 2002 || Socorro || LINEAR || — || align=right | 3.3 km || 
|-id=331 bgcolor=#fefefe
| 232331 ||  || — || October 4, 2002 || Socorro || LINEAR || — || align=right | 1.1 km || 
|-id=332 bgcolor=#d6d6d6
| 232332 ||  || — || October 4, 2002 || Socorro || LINEAR || EOS || align=right | 2.7 km || 
|-id=333 bgcolor=#d6d6d6
| 232333 ||  || — || October 5, 2002 || Socorro || LINEAR || EOS || align=right | 3.0 km || 
|-id=334 bgcolor=#d6d6d6
| 232334 ||  || — || October 4, 2002 || Socorro || LINEAR || — || align=right | 4.4 km || 
|-id=335 bgcolor=#d6d6d6
| 232335 ||  || — || October 4, 2002 || Socorro || LINEAR || — || align=right | 4.9 km || 
|-id=336 bgcolor=#E9E9E9
| 232336 ||  || — || October 10, 2002 || Socorro || LINEAR || TIN || align=right | 3.6 km || 
|-id=337 bgcolor=#d6d6d6
| 232337 ||  || — || October 11, 2002 || Socorro || LINEAR || — || align=right | 5.4 km || 
|-id=338 bgcolor=#fefefe
| 232338 ||  || — || October 12, 2002 || Socorro || LINEAR || V || align=right | 2.0 km || 
|-id=339 bgcolor=#d6d6d6
| 232339 ||  || — || October 4, 2002 || Apache Point || SDSS || — || align=right | 4.5 km || 
|-id=340 bgcolor=#d6d6d6
| 232340 ||  || — || October 5, 2002 || Apache Point || SDSS || HYG || align=right | 3.5 km || 
|-id=341 bgcolor=#d6d6d6
| 232341 ||  || — || October 5, 2002 || Apache Point || SDSS || — || align=right | 5.1 km || 
|-id=342 bgcolor=#d6d6d6
| 232342 ||  || — || October 5, 2002 || Palomar || NEAT || — || align=right | 3.3 km || 
|-id=343 bgcolor=#d6d6d6
| 232343 ||  || — || October 31, 2002 || Palomar || NEAT || THM || align=right | 3.4 km || 
|-id=344 bgcolor=#d6d6d6
| 232344 ||  || — || October 29, 2002 || Apache Point || SDSS || VER || align=right | 4.4 km || 
|-id=345 bgcolor=#d6d6d6
| 232345 ||  || — || October 20, 2002 || Palomar || NEAT || — || align=right | 4.3 km || 
|-id=346 bgcolor=#d6d6d6
| 232346 ||  || — || November 5, 2002 || Socorro || LINEAR || EOS || align=right | 3.3 km || 
|-id=347 bgcolor=#fefefe
| 232347 ||  || — || November 6, 2002 || Haleakala || NEAT || — || align=right | 1.0 km || 
|-id=348 bgcolor=#E9E9E9
| 232348 ||  || — || November 3, 2002 || Haleakala || NEAT || DOR || align=right | 5.5 km || 
|-id=349 bgcolor=#fefefe
| 232349 ||  || — || November 8, 2002 || Socorro || LINEAR || — || align=right | 1.2 km || 
|-id=350 bgcolor=#fefefe
| 232350 ||  || — || November 7, 2002 || Socorro || LINEAR || — || align=right | 1.6 km || 
|-id=351 bgcolor=#d6d6d6
| 232351 ||  || — || November 12, 2002 || Palomar || NEAT || VER || align=right | 3.5 km || 
|-id=352 bgcolor=#fefefe
| 232352 ||  || — || November 12, 2002 || Palomar || NEAT || — || align=right data-sort-value="0.92" | 920 m || 
|-id=353 bgcolor=#d6d6d6
| 232353 ||  || — || November 23, 2002 || Palomar || NEAT || NAE || align=right | 5.0 km || 
|-id=354 bgcolor=#fefefe
| 232354 ||  || — || November 28, 2002 || Anderson Mesa || LONEOS || — || align=right data-sort-value="0.90" | 900 m || 
|-id=355 bgcolor=#d6d6d6
| 232355 ||  || — || November 25, 2002 || Palomar || S. F. Hönig || — || align=right | 3.4 km || 
|-id=356 bgcolor=#d6d6d6
| 232356 ||  || — || November 24, 2002 || Palomar || NEAT || — || align=right | 3.4 km || 
|-id=357 bgcolor=#d6d6d6
| 232357 ||  || — || December 3, 2002 || Palomar || NEAT || — || align=right | 5.4 km || 
|-id=358 bgcolor=#d6d6d6
| 232358 ||  || — || December 10, 2002 || Socorro || LINEAR || NAE || align=right | 4.9 km || 
|-id=359 bgcolor=#fefefe
| 232359 ||  || — || December 10, 2002 || Socorro || LINEAR || — || align=right | 2.8 km || 
|-id=360 bgcolor=#d6d6d6
| 232360 ||  || — || December 10, 2002 || Palomar || NEAT || — || align=right | 5.1 km || 
|-id=361 bgcolor=#d6d6d6
| 232361 ||  || — || December 10, 2002 || Palomar || NEAT || LIX || align=right | 5.2 km || 
|-id=362 bgcolor=#fefefe
| 232362 ||  || — || December 11, 2002 || Socorro || LINEAR || FLO || align=right data-sort-value="0.86" | 860 m || 
|-id=363 bgcolor=#fefefe
| 232363 ||  || — || December 4, 2002 || Kitt Peak || M. W. Buie || — || align=right | 1.0 km || 
|-id=364 bgcolor=#fefefe
| 232364 ||  || — || December 5, 2002 || Socorro || LINEAR || — || align=right | 1.2 km || 
|-id=365 bgcolor=#fefefe
| 232365 ||  || — || December 6, 2002 || Socorro || LINEAR || FLO || align=right data-sort-value="0.72" | 720 m || 
|-id=366 bgcolor=#fefefe
| 232366 ||  || — || December 31, 2002 || Socorro || LINEAR || FLO || align=right data-sort-value="0.78" | 780 m || 
|-id=367 bgcolor=#fefefe
| 232367 ||  || — || January 2, 2003 || Socorro || LINEAR || FLO || align=right data-sort-value="0.90" | 900 m || 
|-id=368 bgcolor=#FFC2E0
| 232368 ||  || — || January 2, 2003 || Socorro || LINEAR || AMO || align=right data-sort-value="0.77" | 770 m || 
|-id=369 bgcolor=#fefefe
| 232369 ||  || — || January 5, 2003 || Socorro || LINEAR || — || align=right | 1.3 km || 
|-id=370 bgcolor=#fefefe
| 232370 ||  || — || January 5, 2003 || Anderson Mesa || LONEOS || PHO || align=right | 1.8 km || 
|-id=371 bgcolor=#fefefe
| 232371 ||  || — || January 4, 2003 || Socorro || LINEAR || — || align=right | 1.3 km || 
|-id=372 bgcolor=#fefefe
| 232372 ||  || — || January 7, 2003 || Socorro || LINEAR || — || align=right | 1.2 km || 
|-id=373 bgcolor=#fefefe
| 232373 ||  || — || January 8, 2003 || Socorro || LINEAR || FLO || align=right data-sort-value="0.94" | 940 m || 
|-id=374 bgcolor=#fefefe
| 232374 ||  || — || January 1, 2003 || Socorro || LINEAR || FLO || align=right data-sort-value="0.95" | 950 m || 
|-id=375 bgcolor=#d6d6d6
| 232375 ||  || — || January 4, 2003 || Socorro || LINEAR || URS || align=right | 6.6 km || 
|-id=376 bgcolor=#fefefe
| 232376 ||  || — || January 24, 2003 || Palomar || NEAT || — || align=right | 3.9 km || 
|-id=377 bgcolor=#fefefe
| 232377 ||  || — || January 26, 2003 || Palomar || NEAT || — || align=right | 1.9 km || 
|-id=378 bgcolor=#fefefe
| 232378 ||  || — || January 26, 2003 || Haleakala || NEAT || FLO || align=right data-sort-value="0.98" | 980 m || 
|-id=379 bgcolor=#fefefe
| 232379 ||  || — || January 27, 2003 || Socorro || LINEAR || — || align=right | 1.1 km || 
|-id=380 bgcolor=#fefefe
| 232380 ||  || — || January 27, 2003 || Socorro || LINEAR || — || align=right | 1.4 km || 
|-id=381 bgcolor=#fefefe
| 232381 ||  || — || January 27, 2003 || Socorro || LINEAR || — || align=right | 1.1 km || 
|-id=382 bgcolor=#FFC2E0
| 232382 ||  || — || January 31, 2003 || Socorro || LINEAR || AMO +1km || align=right | 1.1 km || 
|-id=383 bgcolor=#fefefe
| 232383 ||  || — || January 27, 2003 || Anderson Mesa || LONEOS || — || align=right | 1.3 km || 
|-id=384 bgcolor=#fefefe
| 232384 ||  || — || January 27, 2003 || Anderson Mesa || LONEOS || — || align=right | 1.3 km || 
|-id=385 bgcolor=#fefefe
| 232385 ||  || — || January 27, 2003 || Socorro || LINEAR || — || align=right data-sort-value="0.98" | 980 m || 
|-id=386 bgcolor=#fefefe
| 232386 ||  || — || January 27, 2003 || Anderson Mesa || LONEOS || — || align=right | 1.2 km || 
|-id=387 bgcolor=#fefefe
| 232387 ||  || — || January 27, 2003 || Socorro || LINEAR || — || align=right | 1.0 km || 
|-id=388 bgcolor=#fefefe
| 232388 ||  || — || January 27, 2003 || Haleakala || NEAT || — || align=right | 1.4 km || 
|-id=389 bgcolor=#fefefe
| 232389 ||  || — || January 28, 2003 || Palomar || NEAT || FLO || align=right data-sort-value="0.94" | 940 m || 
|-id=390 bgcolor=#fefefe
| 232390 ||  || — || January 27, 2003 || Socorro || LINEAR || NYS || align=right data-sort-value="0.97" | 970 m || 
|-id=391 bgcolor=#fefefe
| 232391 ||  || — || January 31, 2003 || Socorro || LINEAR || — || align=right | 1.3 km || 
|-id=392 bgcolor=#fefefe
| 232392 ||  || — || January 31, 2003 || Socorro || LINEAR || — || align=right data-sort-value="0.82" | 820 m || 
|-id=393 bgcolor=#d6d6d6
| 232393 ||  || — || January 27, 2003 || Socorro || LINEAR || HIL3:2 || align=right | 6.1 km || 
|-id=394 bgcolor=#d6d6d6
| 232394 ||  || — || January 27, 2003 || Anderson Mesa || LONEOS || — || align=right | 6.6 km || 
|-id=395 bgcolor=#fefefe
| 232395 ||  || — || January 28, 2003 || Socorro || LINEAR || — || align=right | 2.3 km || 
|-id=396 bgcolor=#fefefe
| 232396 ||  || — || February 1, 2003 || Socorro || LINEAR || — || align=right | 2.3 km || 
|-id=397 bgcolor=#FA8072
| 232397 ||  || — || February 3, 2003 || Socorro || LINEAR || PHO || align=right | 2.2 km || 
|-id=398 bgcolor=#fefefe
| 232398 ||  || — || February 1, 2003 || Socorro || LINEAR || — || align=right | 2.5 km || 
|-id=399 bgcolor=#fefefe
| 232399 ||  || — || February 2, 2003 || Anderson Mesa || LONEOS || — || align=right | 1.1 km || 
|-id=400 bgcolor=#fefefe
| 232400 ||  || — || February 2, 2003 || Socorro || LINEAR || — || align=right | 2.5 km || 
|}

232401–232500 

|-bgcolor=#fefefe
| 232401 ||  || — || February 2, 2003 || Palomar || NEAT || FLO || align=right | 1.8 km || 
|-id=402 bgcolor=#d6d6d6
| 232402 ||  || — || February 7, 2003 || Palomar || NEAT || HIL3:2 || align=right | 6.1 km || 
|-id=403 bgcolor=#fefefe
| 232403 ||  || — || February 4, 2003 || Socorro || LINEAR || — || align=right | 1.1 km || 
|-id=404 bgcolor=#fefefe
| 232404 ||  || — || February 21, 2003 || Palomar || NEAT || — || align=right | 1.0 km || 
|-id=405 bgcolor=#fefefe
| 232405 ||  || — || February 23, 2003 || Kitt Peak || Spacewatch || NYS || align=right data-sort-value="0.79" | 790 m || 
|-id=406 bgcolor=#fefefe
| 232406 ||  || — || February 21, 2003 || Palomar || NEAT || — || align=right | 1.8 km || 
|-id=407 bgcolor=#fefefe
| 232407 ||  || — || February 28, 2003 || Socorro || LINEAR || — || align=right | 1.5 km || 
|-id=408 bgcolor=#fefefe
| 232408 ||  || — || March 5, 2003 || Socorro || LINEAR || — || align=right | 1.2 km || 
|-id=409 bgcolor=#fefefe
| 232409 Dubes ||  ||  || March 4, 2003 || Saint-Véran || Saint-Véran Obs. || — || align=right | 1.2 km || 
|-id=410 bgcolor=#fefefe
| 232410 ||  || — || March 5, 2003 || Socorro || LINEAR || — || align=right | 2.1 km || 
|-id=411 bgcolor=#fefefe
| 232411 ||  || — || March 6, 2003 || Socorro || LINEAR || FLO || align=right data-sort-value="0.81" | 810 m || 
|-id=412 bgcolor=#fefefe
| 232412 ||  || — || March 6, 2003 || Socorro || LINEAR || V || align=right | 1.00 km || 
|-id=413 bgcolor=#fefefe
| 232413 ||  || — || March 6, 2003 || Socorro || LINEAR || — || align=right | 1.3 km || 
|-id=414 bgcolor=#fefefe
| 232414 ||  || — || March 6, 2003 || Socorro || LINEAR || — || align=right | 2.8 km || 
|-id=415 bgcolor=#fefefe
| 232415 ||  || — || March 6, 2003 || Anderson Mesa || LONEOS || NYS || align=right | 1.0 km || 
|-id=416 bgcolor=#fefefe
| 232416 ||  || — || March 6, 2003 || Socorro || LINEAR || — || align=right | 1.1 km || 
|-id=417 bgcolor=#fefefe
| 232417 ||  || — || March 6, 2003 || Cima Ekar || ADAS || — || align=right | 1.4 km || 
|-id=418 bgcolor=#fefefe
| 232418 ||  || — || March 6, 2003 || Anderson Mesa || LONEOS || — || align=right | 1.1 km || 
|-id=419 bgcolor=#fefefe
| 232419 ||  || — || March 6, 2003 || Socorro || LINEAR || ERI || align=right | 3.0 km || 
|-id=420 bgcolor=#fefefe
| 232420 ||  || — || March 8, 2003 || Kitt Peak || Spacewatch || — || align=right | 1.3 km || 
|-id=421 bgcolor=#fefefe
| 232421 ||  || — || March 10, 2003 || Socorro || LINEAR || — || align=right | 1.3 km || 
|-id=422 bgcolor=#fefefe
| 232422 ||  || — || March 9, 2003 || Anderson Mesa || LONEOS || — || align=right | 1.2 km || 
|-id=423 bgcolor=#fefefe
| 232423 ||  || — || March 9, 2003 || Socorro || LINEAR || NYS || align=right data-sort-value="0.94" | 940 m || 
|-id=424 bgcolor=#fefefe
| 232424 ||  || — || March 9, 2003 || Kitt Peak || Spacewatch || NYS || align=right data-sort-value="0.92" | 920 m || 
|-id=425 bgcolor=#fefefe
| 232425 ||  || — || March 13, 2003 || Kitt Peak || Spacewatch || MAS || align=right data-sort-value="0.98" | 980 m || 
|-id=426 bgcolor=#E9E9E9
| 232426 ||  || — || March 24, 2003 || Socorro || LINEAR || — || align=right | 6.1 km || 
|-id=427 bgcolor=#fefefe
| 232427 ||  || — || March 23, 2003 || Catalina || CSS || — || align=right | 1.1 km || 
|-id=428 bgcolor=#fefefe
| 232428 ||  || — || March 24, 2003 || Kitt Peak || Spacewatch || — || align=right | 1.4 km || 
|-id=429 bgcolor=#fefefe
| 232429 ||  || — || March 24, 2003 || Haleakala || NEAT || — || align=right | 1.6 km || 
|-id=430 bgcolor=#fefefe
| 232430 ||  || — || March 24, 2003 || Kitt Peak || Spacewatch || V || align=right | 1.2 km || 
|-id=431 bgcolor=#fefefe
| 232431 ||  || — || March 23, 2003 || Kitt Peak || Spacewatch || MAS || align=right data-sort-value="0.76" | 760 m || 
|-id=432 bgcolor=#fefefe
| 232432 ||  || — || March 25, 2003 || Palomar || NEAT || V || align=right data-sort-value="0.94" | 940 m || 
|-id=433 bgcolor=#fefefe
| 232433 ||  || — || March 25, 2003 || Palomar || NEAT || NYS || align=right data-sort-value="0.88" | 880 m || 
|-id=434 bgcolor=#fefefe
| 232434 ||  || — || March 26, 2003 || Palomar || NEAT || NYS || align=right | 1.7 km || 
|-id=435 bgcolor=#fefefe
| 232435 ||  || — || March 26, 2003 || Kitt Peak || Spacewatch || — || align=right | 1.0 km || 
|-id=436 bgcolor=#fefefe
| 232436 ||  || — || March 26, 2003 || Palomar || NEAT || — || align=right | 2.7 km || 
|-id=437 bgcolor=#fefefe
| 232437 ||  || — || March 26, 2003 || Palomar || NEAT || — || align=right | 1.2 km || 
|-id=438 bgcolor=#fefefe
| 232438 ||  || — || March 26, 2003 || Kitt Peak || Spacewatch || — || align=right | 1.2 km || 
|-id=439 bgcolor=#fefefe
| 232439 ||  || — || March 26, 2003 || Palomar || NEAT || — || align=right | 1.2 km || 
|-id=440 bgcolor=#fefefe
| 232440 ||  || — || March 27, 2003 || Catalina || CSS || — || align=right data-sort-value="0.96" | 960 m || 
|-id=441 bgcolor=#fefefe
| 232441 ||  || — || March 27, 2003 || Kitt Peak || Spacewatch || NYS || align=right data-sort-value="0.73" | 730 m || 
|-id=442 bgcolor=#fefefe
| 232442 ||  || — || March 29, 2003 || Anderson Mesa || LONEOS || V || align=right | 1.1 km || 
|-id=443 bgcolor=#E9E9E9
| 232443 ||  || — || March 29, 2003 || Socorro || LINEAR || — || align=right | 3.7 km || 
|-id=444 bgcolor=#fefefe
| 232444 ||  || — || March 31, 2003 || Kitt Peak || Spacewatch || — || align=right | 1.5 km || 
|-id=445 bgcolor=#fefefe
| 232445 ||  || — || March 31, 2003 || Anderson Mesa || LONEOS || NYS || align=right data-sort-value="0.86" | 860 m || 
|-id=446 bgcolor=#fefefe
| 232446 ||  || — || March 31, 2003 || Socorro || LINEAR || NYS || align=right data-sort-value="0.94" | 940 m || 
|-id=447 bgcolor=#fefefe
| 232447 ||  || — || March 24, 2003 || Kitt Peak || Spacewatch || — || align=right data-sort-value="0.94" | 940 m || 
|-id=448 bgcolor=#fefefe
| 232448 ||  || — || March 25, 2003 || Anderson Mesa || LONEOS || — || align=right | 1.0 km || 
|-id=449 bgcolor=#fefefe
| 232449 ||  || — || March 31, 2003 || Catalina || CSS || ERI || align=right | 1.8 km || 
|-id=450 bgcolor=#fefefe
| 232450 ||  || — || April 1, 2003 || Socorro || LINEAR || NYS || align=right | 1.3 km || 
|-id=451 bgcolor=#fefefe
| 232451 ||  || — || April 3, 2003 || Anderson Mesa || LONEOS || NYS || align=right data-sort-value="0.96" | 960 m || 
|-id=452 bgcolor=#fefefe
| 232452 ||  || — || April 3, 2003 || Haleakala || NEAT || — || align=right | 1.4 km || 
|-id=453 bgcolor=#fefefe
| 232453 ||  || — || April 1, 2003 || Socorro || LINEAR || NYS || align=right data-sort-value="0.91" | 910 m || 
|-id=454 bgcolor=#fefefe
| 232454 ||  || — || April 3, 2003 || Anderson Mesa || LONEOS || — || align=right | 1.3 km || 
|-id=455 bgcolor=#fefefe
| 232455 ||  || — || April 4, 2003 || Kitt Peak || Spacewatch || — || align=right | 1.8 km || 
|-id=456 bgcolor=#fefefe
| 232456 ||  || — || April 5, 2003 || Socorro || LINEAR || — || align=right | 1.2 km || 
|-id=457 bgcolor=#fefefe
| 232457 ||  || — || April 5, 2003 || Kitt Peak || Spacewatch || NYS || align=right data-sort-value="0.61" | 610 m || 
|-id=458 bgcolor=#fefefe
| 232458 ||  || — || April 9, 2003 || Socorro || LINEAR || — || align=right | 1.2 km || 
|-id=459 bgcolor=#fefefe
| 232459 ||  || — || April 9, 2003 || Palomar || NEAT || NYS || align=right data-sort-value="0.71" | 710 m || 
|-id=460 bgcolor=#fefefe
| 232460 ||  || — || April 9, 2003 || Socorro || LINEAR || — || align=right | 1.2 km || 
|-id=461 bgcolor=#fefefe
| 232461 ||  || — || April 8, 2003 || Haleakala || NEAT || NYS || align=right data-sort-value="0.84" | 840 m || 
|-id=462 bgcolor=#fefefe
| 232462 ||  || — || April 24, 2003 || Anderson Mesa || LONEOS || — || align=right | 1.0 km || 
|-id=463 bgcolor=#fefefe
| 232463 ||  || — || April 24, 2003 || Anderson Mesa || LONEOS || MAS || align=right data-sort-value="0.90" | 900 m || 
|-id=464 bgcolor=#fefefe
| 232464 ||  || — || April 24, 2003 || Anderson Mesa || LONEOS || ERI || align=right | 2.1 km || 
|-id=465 bgcolor=#fefefe
| 232465 ||  || — || April 26, 2003 || Haleakala || NEAT || — || align=right | 1.0 km || 
|-id=466 bgcolor=#fefefe
| 232466 ||  || — || April 26, 2003 || Haleakala || NEAT || V || align=right | 1.0 km || 
|-id=467 bgcolor=#fefefe
| 232467 ||  || — || April 25, 2003 || Anderson Mesa || LONEOS || V || align=right | 1.7 km || 
|-id=468 bgcolor=#fefefe
| 232468 ||  || — || April 24, 2003 || Anderson Mesa || LONEOS || — || align=right | 1.2 km || 
|-id=469 bgcolor=#E9E9E9
| 232469 ||  || — || April 28, 2003 || Anderson Mesa || LONEOS || — || align=right | 5.0 km || 
|-id=470 bgcolor=#fefefe
| 232470 ||  || — || April 28, 2003 || Anderson Mesa || LONEOS || — || align=right data-sort-value="0.99" | 990 m || 
|-id=471 bgcolor=#fefefe
| 232471 ||  || — || April 29, 2003 || Socorro || LINEAR || V || align=right | 1.1 km || 
|-id=472 bgcolor=#fefefe
| 232472 ||  || — || April 30, 2003 || Kitt Peak || Spacewatch || — || align=right | 1.2 km || 
|-id=473 bgcolor=#fefefe
| 232473 ||  || — || April 30, 2003 || Haleakala || NEAT || V || align=right | 1.0 km || 
|-id=474 bgcolor=#fefefe
| 232474 ||  || — || May 1, 2003 || Socorro || LINEAR || NYS || align=right data-sort-value="0.93" | 930 m || 
|-id=475 bgcolor=#fefefe
| 232475 ||  || — || May 2, 2003 || Socorro || LINEAR || V || align=right | 1.0 km || 
|-id=476 bgcolor=#fefefe
| 232476 ||  || — || May 5, 2003 || Anderson Mesa || LONEOS || V || align=right | 1.0 km || 
|-id=477 bgcolor=#fefefe
| 232477 ||  || — || May 5, 2003 || Socorro || LINEAR || CHL || align=right | 3.3 km || 
|-id=478 bgcolor=#fefefe
| 232478 ||  || — || May 23, 2003 || Kitt Peak || Spacewatch || — || align=right | 1.5 km || 
|-id=479 bgcolor=#fefefe
| 232479 ||  || — || May 25, 2003 || Anderson Mesa || LONEOS || — || align=right | 1.3 km || 
|-id=480 bgcolor=#fefefe
| 232480 ||  || — || May 28, 2003 || Kitt Peak || Spacewatch || — || align=right | 1.2 km || 
|-id=481 bgcolor=#fefefe
| 232481 ||  || — || June 1, 2003 || Kitt Peak || Spacewatch || MAS || align=right | 1.0 km || 
|-id=482 bgcolor=#fefefe
| 232482 ||  || — || June 1, 2003 || Kitt Peak || Spacewatch || MAS || align=right data-sort-value="0.87" | 870 m || 
|-id=483 bgcolor=#fefefe
| 232483 ||  || — || June 25, 2003 || Socorro || LINEAR || PHO || align=right | 2.5 km || 
|-id=484 bgcolor=#E9E9E9
| 232484 ||  || — || June 26, 2003 || Socorro || LINEAR || — || align=right | 1.7 km || 
|-id=485 bgcolor=#E9E9E9
| 232485 ||  || — || June 26, 2003 || Socorro || LINEAR || — || align=right | 2.9 km || 
|-id=486 bgcolor=#E9E9E9
| 232486 ||  || — || July 1, 2003 || Socorro || LINEAR || RAF || align=right | 1.7 km || 
|-id=487 bgcolor=#E9E9E9
| 232487 ||  || — || July 3, 2003 || Kitt Peak || Spacewatch || — || align=right | 1.2 km || 
|-id=488 bgcolor=#E9E9E9
| 232488 ||  || — || July 22, 2003 || Campo Imperatore || CINEOS || ADE || align=right | 3.2 km || 
|-id=489 bgcolor=#d6d6d6
| 232489 ||  || — || July 23, 2003 || Socorro || LINEAR || — || align=right | 3.8 km || 
|-id=490 bgcolor=#fefefe
| 232490 ||  || — || July 23, 2003 || Palomar || NEAT || H || align=right | 1.1 km || 
|-id=491 bgcolor=#E9E9E9
| 232491 ||  || — || July 29, 2003 || Socorro || LINEAR || CLO || align=right | 4.0 km || 
|-id=492 bgcolor=#E9E9E9
| 232492 ||  || — || July 24, 2003 || Palomar || NEAT || — || align=right | 3.0 km || 
|-id=493 bgcolor=#E9E9E9
| 232493 ||  || — || July 24, 2003 || Palomar || NEAT || — || align=right | 2.5 km || 
|-id=494 bgcolor=#d6d6d6
| 232494 ||  || — || July 30, 2003 || Socorro || LINEAR || — || align=right | 6.7 km || 
|-id=495 bgcolor=#E9E9E9
| 232495 ||  || — || August 1, 2003 || Socorro || LINEAR || — || align=right | 4.2 km || 
|-id=496 bgcolor=#E9E9E9
| 232496 ||  || — || August 1, 2003 || Socorro || LINEAR || — || align=right | 1.4 km || 
|-id=497 bgcolor=#fefefe
| 232497 ||  || — || August 2, 2003 || Haleakala || NEAT || ERI || align=right | 2.6 km || 
|-id=498 bgcolor=#E9E9E9
| 232498 ||  || — || August 19, 2003 || Wise || D. Polishook || — || align=right | 3.4 km || 
|-id=499 bgcolor=#E9E9E9
| 232499 ||  || — || August 21, 2003 || Palomar || NEAT || GEF || align=right | 1.9 km || 
|-id=500 bgcolor=#E9E9E9
| 232500 ||  || — || August 22, 2003 || Haleakala || NEAT || GEF || align=right | 2.0 km || 
|}

232501–232600 

|-bgcolor=#E9E9E9
| 232501 ||  || — || August 22, 2003 || Palomar || NEAT || — || align=right | 2.5 km || 
|-id=502 bgcolor=#E9E9E9
| 232502 ||  || — || August 22, 2003 || Palomar || NEAT || — || align=right | 3.3 km || 
|-id=503 bgcolor=#E9E9E9
| 232503 ||  || — || August 23, 2003 || Campo Imperatore || CINEOS || — || align=right | 1.6 km || 
|-id=504 bgcolor=#E9E9E9
| 232504 ||  || — || August 22, 2003 || Socorro || LINEAR || — || align=right | 2.2 km || 
|-id=505 bgcolor=#E9E9E9
| 232505 ||  || — || August 22, 2003 || Socorro || LINEAR || — || align=right | 3.1 km || 
|-id=506 bgcolor=#d6d6d6
| 232506 ||  || — || August 24, 2003 || Socorro || LINEAR || — || align=right | 6.0 km || 
|-id=507 bgcolor=#E9E9E9
| 232507 ||  || — || August 23, 2003 || Socorro || LINEAR || — || align=right | 2.6 km || 
|-id=508 bgcolor=#E9E9E9
| 232508 ||  || — || August 24, 2003 || Socorro || LINEAR || NEM || align=right | 4.0 km || 
|-id=509 bgcolor=#d6d6d6
| 232509 ||  || — || August 24, 2003 || Socorro || LINEAR || — || align=right | 3.8 km || 
|-id=510 bgcolor=#E9E9E9
| 232510 ||  || — || August 24, 2003 || Socorro || LINEAR || MRX || align=right | 1.8 km || 
|-id=511 bgcolor=#d6d6d6
| 232511 ||  || — || August 23, 2003 || Palomar || NEAT || — || align=right | 3.2 km || 
|-id=512 bgcolor=#fefefe
| 232512 ||  || — || August 28, 2003 || Haleakala || NEAT || H || align=right data-sort-value="0.82" | 820 m || 
|-id=513 bgcolor=#d6d6d6
| 232513 ||  || — || August 29, 2003 || Haleakala || NEAT || — || align=right | 4.0 km || 
|-id=514 bgcolor=#E9E9E9
| 232514 ||  || — || August 30, 2003 || Kitt Peak || Spacewatch || — || align=right | 1.4 km || 
|-id=515 bgcolor=#E9E9E9
| 232515 ||  || — || August 31, 2003 || Haleakala || NEAT || — || align=right | 3.9 km || 
|-id=516 bgcolor=#fefefe
| 232516 ||  || — || August 29, 2003 || Haleakala || NEAT || — || align=right | 3.2 km || 
|-id=517 bgcolor=#d6d6d6
| 232517 ||  || — || August 27, 2003 || Palomar || NEAT || EUP || align=right | 4.5 km || 
|-id=518 bgcolor=#E9E9E9
| 232518 ||  || — || September 1, 2003 || Socorro || LINEAR || — || align=right | 2.6 km || 
|-id=519 bgcolor=#E9E9E9
| 232519 ||  || — || September 1, 2003 || Socorro || LINEAR || PAD || align=right | 3.4 km || 
|-id=520 bgcolor=#d6d6d6
| 232520 ||  || — || September 15, 2003 || Haleakala || NEAT || — || align=right | 4.9 km || 
|-id=521 bgcolor=#d6d6d6
| 232521 ||  || — || September 15, 2003 || Anderson Mesa || LONEOS || EOS || align=right | 2.7 km || 
|-id=522 bgcolor=#d6d6d6
| 232522 ||  || — || September 15, 2003 || Palomar || NEAT || — || align=right | 5.4 km || 
|-id=523 bgcolor=#E9E9E9
| 232523 ||  || — || September 16, 2003 || Kitt Peak || Spacewatch || — || align=right | 2.6 km || 
|-id=524 bgcolor=#E9E9E9
| 232524 ||  || — || September 16, 2003 || Kitt Peak || Spacewatch || AST || align=right | 2.4 km || 
|-id=525 bgcolor=#d6d6d6
| 232525 ||  || — || September 16, 2003 || Kitt Peak || Spacewatch || EOS || align=right | 4.9 km || 
|-id=526 bgcolor=#E9E9E9
| 232526 ||  || — || September 16, 2003 || Kitt Peak || Spacewatch || PAD || align=right | 3.2 km || 
|-id=527 bgcolor=#d6d6d6
| 232527 ||  || — || September 17, 2003 || Kitt Peak || Spacewatch || — || align=right | 4.2 km || 
|-id=528 bgcolor=#d6d6d6
| 232528 ||  || — || September 16, 2003 || Kitt Peak || Spacewatch || KOR || align=right | 1.8 km || 
|-id=529 bgcolor=#E9E9E9
| 232529 ||  || — || September 16, 2003 || Kitt Peak || Spacewatch || — || align=right | 4.5 km || 
|-id=530 bgcolor=#E9E9E9
| 232530 ||  || — || September 17, 2003 || Kitt Peak || Spacewatch || — || align=right | 3.9 km || 
|-id=531 bgcolor=#d6d6d6
| 232531 ||  || — || September 18, 2003 || Kitt Peak || Spacewatch || KOR || align=right | 1.5 km || 
|-id=532 bgcolor=#d6d6d6
| 232532 ||  || — || September 16, 2003 || Palomar || NEAT || — || align=right | 4.4 km || 
|-id=533 bgcolor=#E9E9E9
| 232533 ||  || — || September 16, 2003 || Anderson Mesa || LONEOS || — || align=right | 4.7 km || 
|-id=534 bgcolor=#E9E9E9
| 232534 ||  || — || September 17, 2003 || Socorro || LINEAR || — || align=right | 3.9 km || 
|-id=535 bgcolor=#d6d6d6
| 232535 ||  || — || September 17, 2003 || Kitt Peak || Spacewatch || — || align=right | 3.9 km || 
|-id=536 bgcolor=#E9E9E9
| 232536 ||  || — || September 18, 2003 || Kitt Peak || Spacewatch || — || align=right | 3.1 km || 
|-id=537 bgcolor=#E9E9E9
| 232537 ||  || — || September 18, 2003 || Kitt Peak || Spacewatch || — || align=right | 2.8 km || 
|-id=538 bgcolor=#E9E9E9
| 232538 ||  || — || September 17, 2003 || Haleakala || NEAT || — || align=right | 2.6 km || 
|-id=539 bgcolor=#E9E9E9
| 232539 ||  || — || September 20, 2003 || Socorro || LINEAR || AGN || align=right | 2.0 km || 
|-id=540 bgcolor=#d6d6d6
| 232540 ||  || — || September 20, 2003 || Palomar || NEAT || — || align=right | 4.6 km || 
|-id=541 bgcolor=#E9E9E9
| 232541 ||  || — || September 16, 2003 || Kitt Peak || Spacewatch || WIT || align=right | 1.5 km || 
|-id=542 bgcolor=#E9E9E9
| 232542 ||  || — || September 17, 2003 || Kitt Peak || Spacewatch || AGN || align=right | 1.4 km || 
|-id=543 bgcolor=#d6d6d6
| 232543 ||  || — || September 20, 2003 || Črni Vrh || Črni Vrh || — || align=right | 4.8 km || 
|-id=544 bgcolor=#d6d6d6
| 232544 ||  || — || September 18, 2003 || Palomar || NEAT || EOS || align=right | 3.2 km || 
|-id=545 bgcolor=#E9E9E9
| 232545 ||  || — || September 18, 2003 || Socorro || LINEAR || PAD || align=right | 2.6 km || 
|-id=546 bgcolor=#d6d6d6
| 232546 ||  || — || September 19, 2003 || Palomar || NEAT || — || align=right | 3.7 km || 
|-id=547 bgcolor=#E9E9E9
| 232547 ||  || — || September 19, 2003 || Socorro || LINEAR || AGN || align=right | 1.9 km || 
|-id=548 bgcolor=#E9E9E9
| 232548 ||  || — || September 17, 2003 || Kitt Peak || Spacewatch || NEM || align=right | 3.1 km || 
|-id=549 bgcolor=#fefefe
| 232549 ||  || — || September 22, 2003 || Socorro || LINEAR || H || align=right | 1.4 km || 
|-id=550 bgcolor=#d6d6d6
| 232550 ||  || — || September 24, 2003 || Socorro || LINEAR || EUP || align=right | 5.7 km || 
|-id=551 bgcolor=#E9E9E9
| 232551 ||  || — || September 24, 2003 || Palomar || NEAT || — || align=right | 4.3 km || 
|-id=552 bgcolor=#d6d6d6
| 232552 ||  || — || September 24, 2003 || Palomar || NEAT || — || align=right | 3.7 km || 
|-id=553 bgcolor=#E9E9E9
| 232553 Randypeterson ||  ||  || September 26, 2003 || Junk Bond || D. Healy || HOF || align=right | 4.2 km || 
|-id=554 bgcolor=#d6d6d6
| 232554 ||  || — || September 27, 2003 || Socorro || LINEAR || — || align=right | 6.2 km || 
|-id=555 bgcolor=#E9E9E9
| 232555 ||  || — || September 26, 2003 || Socorro || LINEAR || — || align=right | 3.1 km || 
|-id=556 bgcolor=#d6d6d6
| 232556 ||  || — || September 27, 2003 || Kitt Peak || Spacewatch || — || align=right | 2.9 km || 
|-id=557 bgcolor=#E9E9E9
| 232557 ||  || — || September 26, 2003 || Socorro || LINEAR || — || align=right | 3.2 km || 
|-id=558 bgcolor=#E9E9E9
| 232558 ||  || — || September 27, 2003 || Anderson Mesa || LONEOS || AGN || align=right | 1.9 km || 
|-id=559 bgcolor=#E9E9E9
| 232559 ||  || — || September 25, 2003 || Haleakala || NEAT || MAR || align=right | 1.9 km || 
|-id=560 bgcolor=#E9E9E9
| 232560 ||  || — || September 28, 2003 || Socorro || LINEAR || — || align=right | 4.5 km || 
|-id=561 bgcolor=#E9E9E9
| 232561 ||  || — || September 28, 2003 || Kitt Peak || Spacewatch || — || align=right | 3.7 km || 
|-id=562 bgcolor=#d6d6d6
| 232562 ||  || — || September 29, 2003 || Socorro || LINEAR || — || align=right | 5.9 km || 
|-id=563 bgcolor=#E9E9E9
| 232563 ||  || — || September 30, 2003 || Kitt Peak || Spacewatch || MRX || align=right | 1.5 km || 
|-id=564 bgcolor=#E9E9E9
| 232564 ||  || — || September 21, 2003 || Palomar || NEAT || EUN || align=right | 2.2 km || 
|-id=565 bgcolor=#E9E9E9
| 232565 ||  || — || September 28, 2003 || Socorro || LINEAR || PAD || align=right | 2.3 km || 
|-id=566 bgcolor=#E9E9E9
| 232566 ||  || — || September 28, 2003 || Anderson Mesa || LONEOS || — || align=right | 3.7 km || 
|-id=567 bgcolor=#E9E9E9
| 232567 ||  || — || September 27, 2003 || Socorro || LINEAR || — || align=right | 3.2 km || 
|-id=568 bgcolor=#d6d6d6
| 232568 ||  || — || September 29, 2003 || Anderson Mesa || LONEOS || LIX || align=right | 5.4 km || 
|-id=569 bgcolor=#E9E9E9
| 232569 ||  || — || September 17, 2003 || Palomar || NEAT || — || align=right | 3.9 km || 
|-id=570 bgcolor=#d6d6d6
| 232570 ||  || — || September 17, 2003 || Palomar || NEAT || — || align=right | 2.9 km || 
|-id=571 bgcolor=#fefefe
| 232571 ||  || — || September 28, 2003 || Socorro || LINEAR || H || align=right data-sort-value="0.89" | 890 m || 
|-id=572 bgcolor=#d6d6d6
| 232572 ||  || — || September 17, 2003 || Palomar || NEAT || — || align=right | 4.6 km || 
|-id=573 bgcolor=#d6d6d6
| 232573 ||  || — || September 26, 2003 || Apache Point || SDSS || VER || align=right | 5.7 km || 
|-id=574 bgcolor=#E9E9E9
| 232574 ||  || — || September 17, 2003 || Kitt Peak || Spacewatch || AGN || align=right | 1.5 km || 
|-id=575 bgcolor=#E9E9E9
| 232575 ||  || — || September 25, 2003 || Palomar || NEAT || GEF || align=right | 2.1 km || 
|-id=576 bgcolor=#d6d6d6
| 232576 ||  || — || September 18, 2003 || Kitt Peak || Spacewatch || — || align=right | 4.9 km || 
|-id=577 bgcolor=#E9E9E9
| 232577 ||  || — || September 26, 2003 || Apache Point || SDSS || AGN || align=right | 1.6 km || 
|-id=578 bgcolor=#E9E9E9
| 232578 ||  || — || September 17, 2003 || Kitt Peak || Spacewatch || — || align=right | 2.6 km || 
|-id=579 bgcolor=#E9E9E9
| 232579 ||  || — || September 19, 2003 || Palomar || NEAT || HOF || align=right | 4.9 km || 
|-id=580 bgcolor=#E9E9E9
| 232580 ||  || — || September 18, 2003 || Bergisch Gladbach || W. Bickel || — || align=right | 3.4 km || 
|-id=581 bgcolor=#d6d6d6
| 232581 ||  || — || September 22, 2003 || Kitt Peak || Spacewatch || KOR || align=right | 1.7 km || 
|-id=582 bgcolor=#E9E9E9
| 232582 ||  || — || September 28, 2003 || Apache Point || SDSS || AGN || align=right | 1.2 km || 
|-id=583 bgcolor=#d6d6d6
| 232583 ||  || — || September 28, 2003 || Apache Point || SDSS || KOR || align=right | 1.5 km || 
|-id=584 bgcolor=#fefefe
| 232584 ||  || — || October 13, 2003 || Palomar || NEAT || H || align=right | 1.1 km || 
|-id=585 bgcolor=#d6d6d6
| 232585 ||  || — || October 14, 2003 || Anderson Mesa || LONEOS || — || align=right | 5.6 km || 
|-id=586 bgcolor=#d6d6d6
| 232586 ||  || — || October 1, 2003 || Kitt Peak || Spacewatch || — || align=right | 5.3 km || 
|-id=587 bgcolor=#d6d6d6
| 232587 ||  || — || October 2, 2003 || Kitt Peak || Spacewatch || — || align=right | 5.5 km || 
|-id=588 bgcolor=#E9E9E9
| 232588 ||  || — || October 5, 2003 || Socorro || LINEAR || — || align=right | 4.8 km || 
|-id=589 bgcolor=#d6d6d6
| 232589 ||  || — || October 5, 2003 || Socorro || LINEAR || BRA || align=right | 2.5 km || 
|-id=590 bgcolor=#E9E9E9
| 232590 ||  || — || October 5, 2003 || Kitt Peak || Spacewatch || — || align=right | 2.6 km || 
|-id=591 bgcolor=#d6d6d6
| 232591 ||  || — || October 5, 2003 || Kitt Peak || Spacewatch || HYG || align=right | 3.5 km || 
|-id=592 bgcolor=#E9E9E9
| 232592 ||  || — || October 16, 2003 || Kitt Peak || Spacewatch || — || align=right | 2.7 km || 
|-id=593 bgcolor=#d6d6d6
| 232593 ||  || — || October 17, 2003 || Socorro || LINEAR || — || align=right | 4.5 km || 
|-id=594 bgcolor=#d6d6d6
| 232594 ||  || — || October 18, 2003 || Socorro || LINEAR || EUP || align=right | 6.9 km || 
|-id=595 bgcolor=#E9E9E9
| 232595 ||  || — || October 20, 2003 || Wrightwood || J. W. Young || ADE || align=right | 3.5 km || 
|-id=596 bgcolor=#fefefe
| 232596 ||  || — || October 23, 2003 || Socorro || LINEAR || H || align=right | 1.5 km || 
|-id=597 bgcolor=#E9E9E9
| 232597 ||  || — || October 16, 2003 || Palomar || NEAT || — || align=right | 4.8 km || 
|-id=598 bgcolor=#d6d6d6
| 232598 ||  || — || October 18, 2003 || Palomar || NEAT || URS || align=right | 5.5 km || 
|-id=599 bgcolor=#d6d6d6
| 232599 ||  || — || October 18, 2003 || Palomar || NEAT || TRE || align=right | 5.3 km || 
|-id=600 bgcolor=#d6d6d6
| 232600 ||  || — || October 18, 2003 || Palomar || NEAT || — || align=right | 4.0 km || 
|}

232601–232700 

|-bgcolor=#E9E9E9
| 232601 ||  || — || October 17, 2003 || Kitt Peak || Spacewatch || WIT || align=right | 1.7 km || 
|-id=602 bgcolor=#d6d6d6
| 232602 ||  || — || October 19, 2003 || Kitt Peak || Spacewatch || — || align=right | 3.3 km || 
|-id=603 bgcolor=#E9E9E9
| 232603 ||  || — || October 19, 2003 || Kitt Peak || Spacewatch || — || align=right | 3.5 km || 
|-id=604 bgcolor=#E9E9E9
| 232604 ||  || — || October 17, 2003 || Anderson Mesa || LONEOS || NEM || align=right | 3.5 km || 
|-id=605 bgcolor=#E9E9E9
| 232605 ||  || — || October 17, 2003 || Kitt Peak || Spacewatch || HOF || align=right | 4.2 km || 
|-id=606 bgcolor=#d6d6d6
| 232606 ||  || — || October 18, 2003 || Palomar || NEAT || — || align=right | 3.9 km || 
|-id=607 bgcolor=#d6d6d6
| 232607 ||  || — || October 20, 2003 || Kitt Peak || Spacewatch || — || align=right | 4.5 km || 
|-id=608 bgcolor=#d6d6d6
| 232608 ||  || — || October 18, 2003 || Kitt Peak || Spacewatch || KOR || align=right | 1.8 km || 
|-id=609 bgcolor=#d6d6d6
| 232609 ||  || — || October 18, 2003 || Kitt Peak || Spacewatch || — || align=right | 3.5 km || 
|-id=610 bgcolor=#E9E9E9
| 232610 ||  || — || October 19, 2003 || Palomar || NEAT || — || align=right | 3.7 km || 
|-id=611 bgcolor=#E9E9E9
| 232611 ||  || — || October 20, 2003 || Kitt Peak || Spacewatch || WIT || align=right | 1.3 km || 
|-id=612 bgcolor=#d6d6d6
| 232612 ||  || — || October 17, 2003 || Kitt Peak || Spacewatch || EOS || align=right | 5.9 km || 
|-id=613 bgcolor=#d6d6d6
| 232613 ||  || — || October 18, 2003 || Kitt Peak || Spacewatch || — || align=right | 5.4 km || 
|-id=614 bgcolor=#d6d6d6
| 232614 ||  || — || October 19, 2003 || Anderson Mesa || LONEOS || — || align=right | 4.0 km || 
|-id=615 bgcolor=#d6d6d6
| 232615 ||  || — || October 20, 2003 || Palomar || NEAT || — || align=right | 3.8 km || 
|-id=616 bgcolor=#d6d6d6
| 232616 ||  || — || October 20, 2003 || Palomar || NEAT || — || align=right | 4.7 km || 
|-id=617 bgcolor=#d6d6d6
| 232617 ||  || — || October 19, 2003 || Anderson Mesa || LONEOS || TRP || align=right | 3.4 km || 
|-id=618 bgcolor=#d6d6d6
| 232618 ||  || — || October 21, 2003 || Anderson Mesa || LONEOS || EOS || align=right | 2.9 km || 
|-id=619 bgcolor=#E9E9E9
| 232619 ||  || — || October 21, 2003 || Socorro || LINEAR || — || align=right | 3.6 km || 
|-id=620 bgcolor=#d6d6d6
| 232620 ||  || — || October 19, 2003 || Anderson Mesa || LONEOS || — || align=right | 3.5 km || 
|-id=621 bgcolor=#E9E9E9
| 232621 ||  || — || October 21, 2003 || Socorro || LINEAR || ADE || align=right | 3.7 km || 
|-id=622 bgcolor=#d6d6d6
| 232622 ||  || — || October 22, 2003 || Kitt Peak || Spacewatch || — || align=right | 3.3 km || 
|-id=623 bgcolor=#d6d6d6
| 232623 ||  || — || October 19, 2003 || Kitt Peak || Spacewatch || — || align=right | 2.7 km || 
|-id=624 bgcolor=#d6d6d6
| 232624 ||  || — || October 19, 2003 || Kitt Peak || Spacewatch || — || align=right | 2.6 km || 
|-id=625 bgcolor=#E9E9E9
| 232625 ||  || — || October 21, 2003 || Palomar || NEAT || WIT || align=right | 1.6 km || 
|-id=626 bgcolor=#E9E9E9
| 232626 ||  || — || October 21, 2003 || Socorro || LINEAR || AGN || align=right | 2.1 km || 
|-id=627 bgcolor=#d6d6d6
| 232627 ||  || — || October 22, 2003 || Haleakala || NEAT || — || align=right | 4.0 km || 
|-id=628 bgcolor=#d6d6d6
| 232628 ||  || — || October 21, 2003 || Socorro || LINEAR || — || align=right | 4.5 km || 
|-id=629 bgcolor=#d6d6d6
| 232629 ||  || — || October 21, 2003 || Socorro || LINEAR || — || align=right | 2.3 km || 
|-id=630 bgcolor=#E9E9E9
| 232630 ||  || — || October 22, 2003 || Socorro || LINEAR || — || align=right | 3.5 km || 
|-id=631 bgcolor=#d6d6d6
| 232631 ||  || — || October 23, 2003 || Kitt Peak || Spacewatch || THM || align=right | 2.5 km || 
|-id=632 bgcolor=#d6d6d6
| 232632 ||  || — || October 22, 2003 || Kitt Peak || Spacewatch || — || align=right | 4.6 km || 
|-id=633 bgcolor=#d6d6d6
| 232633 ||  || — || October 22, 2003 || Kitt Peak || Spacewatch || — || align=right | 4.1 km || 
|-id=634 bgcolor=#d6d6d6
| 232634 ||  || — || October 22, 2003 || Kitt Peak || Spacewatch || VER || align=right | 3.8 km || 
|-id=635 bgcolor=#E9E9E9
| 232635 ||  || — || October 23, 2003 || Anderson Mesa || LONEOS || AGN || align=right | 1.8 km || 
|-id=636 bgcolor=#d6d6d6
| 232636 ||  || — || October 25, 2003 || Socorro || LINEAR || — || align=right | 4.5 km || 
|-id=637 bgcolor=#d6d6d6
| 232637 ||  || — || October 25, 2003 || Socorro || LINEAR || — || align=right | 3.6 km || 
|-id=638 bgcolor=#E9E9E9
| 232638 ||  || — || October 25, 2003 || Socorro || LINEAR || — || align=right | 3.6 km || 
|-id=639 bgcolor=#d6d6d6
| 232639 ||  || — || October 29, 2003 || Catalina || CSS || — || align=right | 4.5 km || 
|-id=640 bgcolor=#d6d6d6
| 232640 ||  || — || October 21, 2003 || Anderson Mesa || LONEOS || — || align=right | 6.4 km || 
|-id=641 bgcolor=#d6d6d6
| 232641 ||  || — || October 16, 2003 || Kitt Peak || Spacewatch || — || align=right | 3.1 km || 
|-id=642 bgcolor=#d6d6d6
| 232642 ||  || — || October 18, 2003 || Kitt Peak || Spacewatch || — || align=right | 4.9 km || 
|-id=643 bgcolor=#E9E9E9
| 232643 ||  || — || October 20, 2003 || Palomar || NEAT || — || align=right | 3.6 km || 
|-id=644 bgcolor=#d6d6d6
| 232644 ||  || — || October 19, 2003 || Kitt Peak || Spacewatch || — || align=right | 2.7 km || 
|-id=645 bgcolor=#E9E9E9
| 232645 ||  || — || October 22, 2003 || Apache Point || SDSS || — || align=right | 2.5 km || 
|-id=646 bgcolor=#E9E9E9
| 232646 ||  || — || October 22, 2003 || Apache Point || SDSS || NEM || align=right | 2.6 km || 
|-id=647 bgcolor=#d6d6d6
| 232647 ||  || — || October 21, 2003 || Palomar || NEAT || EOS || align=right | 2.6 km || 
|-id=648 bgcolor=#d6d6d6
| 232648 ||  || — || November 15, 2003 || Palomar || NEAT || — || align=right | 3.4 km || 
|-id=649 bgcolor=#d6d6d6
| 232649 ||  || — || November 16, 2003 || Catalina || CSS || — || align=right | 4.3 km || 
|-id=650 bgcolor=#E9E9E9
| 232650 ||  || — || November 16, 2003 || Kitt Peak || Spacewatch || — || align=right | 3.0 km || 
|-id=651 bgcolor=#d6d6d6
| 232651 ||  || — || November 16, 2003 || Kitt Peak || Spacewatch || — || align=right | 4.5 km || 
|-id=652 bgcolor=#d6d6d6
| 232652 ||  || — || November 18, 2003 || Palomar || NEAT || EOS || align=right | 5.0 km || 
|-id=653 bgcolor=#d6d6d6
| 232653 ||  || — || November 19, 2003 || Socorro || LINEAR || — || align=right | 4.5 km || 
|-id=654 bgcolor=#E9E9E9
| 232654 ||  || — || November 19, 2003 || Socorro || LINEAR || DOR || align=right | 2.9 km || 
|-id=655 bgcolor=#d6d6d6
| 232655 ||  || — || November 19, 2003 || Socorro || LINEAR || — || align=right | 3.5 km || 
|-id=656 bgcolor=#d6d6d6
| 232656 ||  || — || November 18, 2003 || Kitt Peak || Spacewatch || EOS || align=right | 2.9 km || 
|-id=657 bgcolor=#d6d6d6
| 232657 ||  || — || November 19, 2003 || Socorro || LINEAR || LIX || align=right | 4.6 km || 
|-id=658 bgcolor=#E9E9E9
| 232658 ||  || — || November 19, 2003 || Palomar || NEAT || — || align=right | 4.1 km || 
|-id=659 bgcolor=#d6d6d6
| 232659 ||  || — || November 19, 2003 || Palomar || NEAT || — || align=right | 2.8 km || 
|-id=660 bgcolor=#d6d6d6
| 232660 ||  || — || November 18, 2003 || Palomar || NEAT || — || align=right | 6.6 km || 
|-id=661 bgcolor=#d6d6d6
| 232661 ||  || — || November 20, 2003 || Socorro || LINEAR || — || align=right | 6.4 km || 
|-id=662 bgcolor=#d6d6d6
| 232662 ||  || — || November 20, 2003 || Socorro || LINEAR || HYG || align=right | 3.6 km || 
|-id=663 bgcolor=#d6d6d6
| 232663 ||  || — || November 20, 2003 || Socorro || LINEAR || — || align=right | 3.1 km || 
|-id=664 bgcolor=#d6d6d6
| 232664 ||  || — || November 21, 2003 || Socorro || LINEAR || — || align=right | 4.4 km || 
|-id=665 bgcolor=#d6d6d6
| 232665 ||  || — || November 30, 2003 || Kitt Peak || Spacewatch || — || align=right | 3.3 km || 
|-id=666 bgcolor=#d6d6d6
| 232666 ||  || — || November 30, 2003 || Kitt Peak || Spacewatch || — || align=right | 2.5 km || 
|-id=667 bgcolor=#d6d6d6
| 232667 ||  || — || November 29, 2003 || Socorro || LINEAR || EUP || align=right | 6.1 km || 
|-id=668 bgcolor=#d6d6d6
| 232668 ||  || — || December 1, 2003 || Socorro || LINEAR || — || align=right | 3.4 km || 
|-id=669 bgcolor=#d6d6d6
| 232669 ||  || — || December 14, 2003 || Palomar || NEAT || — || align=right | 3.6 km || 
|-id=670 bgcolor=#d6d6d6
| 232670 ||  || — || December 14, 2003 || Palomar || NEAT || — || align=right | 3.5 km || 
|-id=671 bgcolor=#d6d6d6
| 232671 ||  || — || December 15, 2003 || Palomar || NEAT || EOS || align=right | 2.7 km || 
|-id=672 bgcolor=#d6d6d6
| 232672 ||  || — || December 14, 2003 || Kitt Peak || Spacewatch || — || align=right | 2.7 km || 
|-id=673 bgcolor=#d6d6d6
| 232673 ||  || — || December 16, 2003 || Kitt Peak || Spacewatch || — || align=right | 3.2 km || 
|-id=674 bgcolor=#d6d6d6
| 232674 ||  || — || December 21, 2003 || Sandlot || Sandlot Obs. || EOS || align=right | 3.3 km || 
|-id=675 bgcolor=#d6d6d6
| 232675 ||  || — || December 19, 2003 || Socorro || LINEAR || — || align=right | 5.2 km || 
|-id=676 bgcolor=#d6d6d6
| 232676 ||  || — || December 19, 2003 || Socorro || LINEAR || — || align=right | 3.1 km || 
|-id=677 bgcolor=#d6d6d6
| 232677 ||  || — || December 19, 2003 || Socorro || LINEAR || — || align=right | 5.4 km || 
|-id=678 bgcolor=#d6d6d6
| 232678 ||  || — || December 18, 2003 || Socorro || LINEAR || — || align=right | 5.3 km || 
|-id=679 bgcolor=#d6d6d6
| 232679 ||  || — || December 19, 2003 || Socorro || LINEAR || — || align=right | 5.3 km || 
|-id=680 bgcolor=#d6d6d6
| 232680 ||  || — || December 27, 2003 || Kitt Peak || Spacewatch || HYG || align=right | 5.0 km || 
|-id=681 bgcolor=#d6d6d6
| 232681 ||  || — || December 27, 2003 || Kitt Peak || Spacewatch || HYG || align=right | 4.3 km || 
|-id=682 bgcolor=#d6d6d6
| 232682 ||  || — || December 27, 2003 || Socorro || LINEAR || — || align=right | 4.3 km || 
|-id=683 bgcolor=#d6d6d6
| 232683 ||  || — || December 28, 2003 || Socorro || LINEAR || — || align=right | 5.7 km || 
|-id=684 bgcolor=#d6d6d6
| 232684 ||  || — || December 28, 2003 || Socorro || LINEAR || — || align=right | 3.7 km || 
|-id=685 bgcolor=#d6d6d6
| 232685 ||  || — || December 28, 2003 || Socorro || LINEAR || — || align=right | 4.8 km || 
|-id=686 bgcolor=#d6d6d6
| 232686 ||  || — || December 28, 2003 || Socorro || LINEAR || EOS || align=right | 3.3 km || 
|-id=687 bgcolor=#d6d6d6
| 232687 ||  || — || December 29, 2003 || Catalina || CSS || EUP || align=right | 8.0 km || 
|-id=688 bgcolor=#d6d6d6
| 232688 ||  || — || December 29, 2003 || Kitt Peak || Spacewatch || — || align=right | 5.6 km || 
|-id=689 bgcolor=#d6d6d6
| 232689 ||  || — || December 17, 2003 || Socorro || LINEAR || ALA || align=right | 7.0 km || 
|-id=690 bgcolor=#d6d6d6
| 232690 ||  || — || December 21, 2003 || Socorro || LINEAR || EOS || align=right | 3.2 km || 
|-id=691 bgcolor=#FFC2E0
| 232691 ||  || — || January 13, 2004 || Socorro || LINEAR || APOPHA || align=right data-sort-value="0.39" | 390 m || 
|-id=692 bgcolor=#d6d6d6
| 232692 ||  || — || January 15, 2004 || Kitt Peak || Spacewatch || URS || align=right | 5.4 km || 
|-id=693 bgcolor=#d6d6d6
| 232693 ||  || — || January 14, 2004 || Palomar || NEAT || — || align=right | 7.2 km || 
|-id=694 bgcolor=#d6d6d6
| 232694 ||  || — || January 13, 2004 || Anderson Mesa || LONEOS || — || align=right | 3.7 km || 
|-id=695 bgcolor=#d6d6d6
| 232695 ||  || — || January 13, 2004 || Palomar || NEAT || — || align=right | 3.9 km || 
|-id=696 bgcolor=#d6d6d6
| 232696 ||  || — || January 16, 2004 || Palomar || NEAT || — || align=right | 5.0 km || 
|-id=697 bgcolor=#d6d6d6
| 232697 ||  || — || January 17, 2004 || Palomar || NEAT || HYG || align=right | 3.5 km || 
|-id=698 bgcolor=#d6d6d6
| 232698 ||  || — || January 17, 2004 || Palomar || NEAT || — || align=right | 4.8 km || 
|-id=699 bgcolor=#d6d6d6
| 232699 ||  || — || January 16, 2004 || Palomar || NEAT || — || align=right | 4.6 km || 
|-id=700 bgcolor=#d6d6d6
| 232700 ||  || — || January 16, 2004 || Palomar || NEAT || HYG || align=right | 3.9 km || 
|}

232701–232800 

|-bgcolor=#d6d6d6
| 232701 ||  || — || January 18, 2004 || Palomar || NEAT || — || align=right | 5.1 km || 
|-id=702 bgcolor=#fefefe
| 232702 ||  || — || January 18, 2004 || Palomar || NEAT || — || align=right data-sort-value="0.87" | 870 m || 
|-id=703 bgcolor=#d6d6d6
| 232703 ||  || — || January 18, 2004 || Palomar || NEAT || — || align=right | 3.8 km || 
|-id=704 bgcolor=#d6d6d6
| 232704 ||  || — || January 19, 2004 || Kitt Peak || Spacewatch || — || align=right | 4.2 km || 
|-id=705 bgcolor=#E9E9E9
| 232705 ||  || — || January 21, 2004 || Socorro || LINEAR || — || align=right | 3.6 km || 
|-id=706 bgcolor=#d6d6d6
| 232706 ||  || — || January 21, 2004 || Socorro || LINEAR || — || align=right | 3.5 km || 
|-id=707 bgcolor=#d6d6d6
| 232707 ||  || — || January 21, 2004 || Socorro || LINEAR || — || align=right | 6.6 km || 
|-id=708 bgcolor=#d6d6d6
| 232708 ||  || — || January 22, 2004 || Socorro || LINEAR || — || align=right | 2.6 km || 
|-id=709 bgcolor=#d6d6d6
| 232709 ||  || — || January 24, 2004 || Socorro || LINEAR || — || align=right | 2.6 km || 
|-id=710 bgcolor=#d6d6d6
| 232710 ||  || — || January 23, 2004 || Socorro || LINEAR || HYG || align=right | 3.7 km || 
|-id=711 bgcolor=#d6d6d6
| 232711 ||  || — || January 24, 2004 || Socorro || LINEAR || — || align=right | 6.9 km || 
|-id=712 bgcolor=#d6d6d6
| 232712 ||  || — || January 24, 2004 || Socorro || LINEAR || — || align=right | 5.2 km || 
|-id=713 bgcolor=#d6d6d6
| 232713 ||  || — || January 24, 2004 || Socorro || LINEAR || LIX || align=right | 6.2 km || 
|-id=714 bgcolor=#d6d6d6
| 232714 ||  || — || January 26, 2004 || Anderson Mesa || LONEOS || HYG || align=right | 3.4 km || 
|-id=715 bgcolor=#d6d6d6
| 232715 ||  || — || January 27, 2004 || Anderson Mesa || LONEOS || ALA || align=right | 7.0 km || 
|-id=716 bgcolor=#d6d6d6
| 232716 ||  || — || January 27, 2004 || Kitt Peak || Spacewatch || — || align=right | 4.9 km || 
|-id=717 bgcolor=#d6d6d6
| 232717 ||  || — || January 31, 2004 || Socorro || LINEAR || — || align=right | 5.6 km || 
|-id=718 bgcolor=#d6d6d6
| 232718 ||  || — || January 16, 2004 || Kitt Peak || Spacewatch || — || align=right | 3.5 km || 
|-id=719 bgcolor=#d6d6d6
| 232719 ||  || — || January 19, 2004 || Catalina || CSS || THM || align=right | 3.1 km || 
|-id=720 bgcolor=#d6d6d6
| 232720 ||  || — || February 9, 2004 || Palomar || NEAT || — || align=right | 3.0 km || 
|-id=721 bgcolor=#d6d6d6
| 232721 ||  || — || February 10, 2004 || Catalina || CSS || EOS || align=right | 2.8 km || 
|-id=722 bgcolor=#d6d6d6
| 232722 ||  || — || February 11, 2004 || Palomar || NEAT || — || align=right | 3.5 km || 
|-id=723 bgcolor=#d6d6d6
| 232723 ||  || — || February 12, 2004 || Kitt Peak || Spacewatch || — || align=right | 3.8 km || 
|-id=724 bgcolor=#d6d6d6
| 232724 ||  || — || February 11, 2004 || Anderson Mesa || LONEOS || — || align=right | 5.7 km || 
|-id=725 bgcolor=#d6d6d6
| 232725 ||  || — || February 14, 2004 || Socorro || LINEAR || — || align=right | 5.5 km || 
|-id=726 bgcolor=#d6d6d6
| 232726 ||  || — || February 14, 2004 || Haleakala || NEAT || 7:4 || align=right | 4.8 km || 
|-id=727 bgcolor=#d6d6d6
| 232727 ||  || — || February 11, 2004 || Kitt Peak || Spacewatch || THM || align=right | 3.0 km || 
|-id=728 bgcolor=#d6d6d6
| 232728 ||  || — || February 16, 2004 || Kitt Peak || Spacewatch || — || align=right | 3.3 km || 
|-id=729 bgcolor=#fefefe
| 232729 ||  || — || February 18, 2004 || Kitt Peak || Spacewatch || — || align=right data-sort-value="0.94" | 940 m || 
|-id=730 bgcolor=#d6d6d6
| 232730 ||  || — || March 11, 2004 || Palomar || NEAT || — || align=right | 4.4 km || 
|-id=731 bgcolor=#d6d6d6
| 232731 ||  || — || March 11, 2004 || Palomar || NEAT || EOS || align=right | 3.2 km || 
|-id=732 bgcolor=#d6d6d6
| 232732 ||  || — || March 12, 2004 || Palomar || NEAT || — || align=right | 5.2 km || 
|-id=733 bgcolor=#d6d6d6
| 232733 ||  || — || March 10, 2004 || Palomar || NEAT || — || align=right | 4.6 km || 
|-id=734 bgcolor=#d6d6d6
| 232734 ||  || — || March 15, 2004 || Kitt Peak || Spacewatch || — || align=right | 4.0 km || 
|-id=735 bgcolor=#fefefe
| 232735 ||  || — || March 17, 2004 || Kitt Peak || Spacewatch || — || align=right | 1.1 km || 
|-id=736 bgcolor=#fefefe
| 232736 ||  || — || March 17, 2004 || Socorro || LINEAR || PHO || align=right | 1.6 km || 
|-id=737 bgcolor=#fefefe
| 232737 ||  || — || March 28, 2004 || Socorro || LINEAR || — || align=right | 1.1 km || 
|-id=738 bgcolor=#d6d6d6
| 232738 ||  || — || March 16, 2004 || Catalina || CSS || ALA || align=right | 5.4 km || 
|-id=739 bgcolor=#d6d6d6
| 232739 ||  || — || March 19, 2004 || Socorro || LINEAR || — || align=right | 4.0 km || 
|-id=740 bgcolor=#fefefe
| 232740 ||  || — || March 18, 2004 || Socorro || LINEAR || FLO || align=right | 2.4 km || 
|-id=741 bgcolor=#d6d6d6
| 232741 ||  || — || March 18, 2004 || Catalina || CSS || — || align=right | 4.0 km || 
|-id=742 bgcolor=#E9E9E9
| 232742 ||  || — || March 23, 2004 || Socorro || LINEAR || WIT || align=right | 1.5 km || 
|-id=743 bgcolor=#fefefe
| 232743 ||  || — || March 23, 2004 || Socorro || LINEAR || FLO || align=right data-sort-value="0.94" | 940 m || 
|-id=744 bgcolor=#fefefe
| 232744 ||  || — || April 13, 2004 || Kitt Peak || Spacewatch || — || align=right | 3.2 km || 
|-id=745 bgcolor=#d6d6d6
| 232745 ||  || — || April 17, 2004 || Socorro || LINEAR || 7:4 || align=right | 5.4 km || 
|-id=746 bgcolor=#fefefe
| 232746 ||  || — || April 16, 2004 || Catalina || CSS || H || align=right data-sort-value="0.84" | 840 m || 
|-id=747 bgcolor=#d6d6d6
| 232747 ||  || — || May 13, 2004 || Anderson Mesa || LONEOS || — || align=right | 5.7 km || 
|-id=748 bgcolor=#fefefe
| 232748 ||  || — || May 14, 2004 || Anderson Mesa || LONEOS || — || align=right | 3.1 km || 
|-id=749 bgcolor=#d6d6d6
| 232749 ||  || — || May 9, 2004 || Kitt Peak || Spacewatch || THM || align=right | 3.6 km || 
|-id=750 bgcolor=#fefefe
| 232750 ||  || — || May 14, 2004 || Socorro || LINEAR || — || align=right | 1.2 km || 
|-id=751 bgcolor=#d6d6d6
| 232751 ||  || — || May 16, 2004 || Socorro || LINEAR || — || align=right | 6.0 km || 
|-id=752 bgcolor=#E9E9E9
| 232752 ||  || — || May 16, 2004 || Socorro || LINEAR || — || align=right | 3.7 km || 
|-id=753 bgcolor=#fefefe
| 232753 ||  || — || June 12, 2004 || Socorro || LINEAR || — || align=right | 1.8 km || 
|-id=754 bgcolor=#fefefe
| 232754 ||  || — || July 10, 2004 || Palomar || NEAT || FLO || align=right data-sort-value="0.98" | 980 m || 
|-id=755 bgcolor=#fefefe
| 232755 ||  || — || July 12, 2004 || Reedy Creek || J. Broughton || — || align=right data-sort-value="0.80" | 800 m || 
|-id=756 bgcolor=#fefefe
| 232756 ||  || — || July 11, 2004 || Socorro || LINEAR || — || align=right | 1.7 km || 
|-id=757 bgcolor=#FA8072
| 232757 ||  || — || July 13, 2004 || Palomar || NEAT || — || align=right | 1.2 km || 
|-id=758 bgcolor=#E9E9E9
| 232758 ||  || — || July 25, 2004 || Needville || Needville Obs. || KAZ || align=right | 1.6 km || 
|-id=759 bgcolor=#fefefe
| 232759 ||  || — || August 3, 2004 || Siding Spring || SSS || — || align=right | 1.2 km || 
|-id=760 bgcolor=#fefefe
| 232760 ||  || — || August 6, 2004 || Palomar || NEAT || — || align=right | 1.4 km || 
|-id=761 bgcolor=#fefefe
| 232761 ||  || — || August 8, 2004 || Socorro || LINEAR || — || align=right data-sort-value="0.98" | 980 m || 
|-id=762 bgcolor=#fefefe
| 232762 ||  || — || August 8, 2004 || Socorro || LINEAR || — || align=right | 2.1 km || 
|-id=763 bgcolor=#fefefe
| 232763 Eliewiesel ||  ||  || August 10, 2004 || Francisquito || R. E. Jones || FLO || align=right | 1.2 km || 
|-id=764 bgcolor=#fefefe
| 232764 ||  || — || August 6, 2004 || Palomar || NEAT || — || align=right | 1.1 km || 
|-id=765 bgcolor=#fefefe
| 232765 ||  || — || August 8, 2004 || Socorro || LINEAR || V || align=right | 1.1 km || 
|-id=766 bgcolor=#fefefe
| 232766 ||  || — || August 8, 2004 || Anderson Mesa || LONEOS || NYS || align=right | 2.1 km || 
|-id=767 bgcolor=#fefefe
| 232767 ||  || — || August 9, 2004 || Socorro || LINEAR || — || align=right | 1.6 km || 
|-id=768 bgcolor=#fefefe
| 232768 ||  || — || August 9, 2004 || Socorro || LINEAR || — || align=right | 2.1 km || 
|-id=769 bgcolor=#E9E9E9
| 232769 ||  || — || August 8, 2004 || Socorro || LINEAR || — || align=right | 1.3 km || 
|-id=770 bgcolor=#fefefe
| 232770 ||  || — || August 8, 2004 || Socorro || LINEAR || NYS || align=right data-sort-value="0.83" | 830 m || 
|-id=771 bgcolor=#E9E9E9
| 232771 ||  || — || August 9, 2004 || Socorro || LINEAR || — || align=right | 1.9 km || 
|-id=772 bgcolor=#FA8072
| 232772 ||  || — || August 9, 2004 || Socorro || LINEAR || — || align=right | 2.0 km || 
|-id=773 bgcolor=#fefefe
| 232773 ||  || — || August 8, 2004 || Socorro || LINEAR || MAS || align=right | 1.0 km || 
|-id=774 bgcolor=#fefefe
| 232774 ||  || — || August 8, 2004 || Socorro || LINEAR || — || align=right | 1.6 km || 
|-id=775 bgcolor=#fefefe
| 232775 ||  || — || August 8, 2004 || Anderson Mesa || LONEOS || ERI || align=right | 2.0 km || 
|-id=776 bgcolor=#fefefe
| 232776 ||  || — || August 8, 2004 || Campo Imperatore || CINEOS || — || align=right | 1.9 km || 
|-id=777 bgcolor=#fefefe
| 232777 ||  || — || August 9, 2004 || Anderson Mesa || LONEOS || V || align=right | 1.1 km || 
|-id=778 bgcolor=#E9E9E9
| 232778 ||  || — || August 9, 2004 || Socorro || LINEAR || BRU || align=right | 3.3 km || 
|-id=779 bgcolor=#fefefe
| 232779 ||  || — || August 10, 2004 || Socorro || LINEAR || NYS || align=right data-sort-value="0.91" | 910 m || 
|-id=780 bgcolor=#E9E9E9
| 232780 ||  || — || August 15, 2004 || Reedy Creek || J. Broughton || — || align=right | 3.0 km || 
|-id=781 bgcolor=#fefefe
| 232781 ||  || — || August 10, 2004 || Anderson Mesa || LONEOS || — || align=right | 1.1 km || 
|-id=782 bgcolor=#E9E9E9
| 232782 ||  || — || August 10, 2004 || Socorro || LINEAR || — || align=right | 2.2 km || 
|-id=783 bgcolor=#E9E9E9
| 232783 ||  || — || August 20, 2004 || Reedy Creek || J. Broughton || — || align=right | 1.9 km || 
|-id=784 bgcolor=#fefefe
| 232784 ||  || — || August 20, 2004 || Goodricke-Pigott || R. A. Tucker || NYS || align=right data-sort-value="0.96" | 960 m || 
|-id=785 bgcolor=#E9E9E9
| 232785 ||  || — || August 21, 2004 || Siding Spring || SSS || MAR || align=right | 1.6 km || 
|-id=786 bgcolor=#fefefe
| 232786 ||  || — || August 17, 2004 || Črni Vrh || Črni Vrh || PHO || align=right | 2.4 km || 
|-id=787 bgcolor=#fefefe
| 232787 ||  || — || September 7, 2004 || Socorro || LINEAR || MAS || align=right data-sort-value="0.86" | 860 m || 
|-id=788 bgcolor=#E9E9E9
| 232788 ||  || — || September 7, 2004 || Socorro || LINEAR || HOF || align=right | 4.5 km || 
|-id=789 bgcolor=#E9E9E9
| 232789 ||  || — || September 7, 2004 || Socorro || LINEAR || — || align=right | 1.1 km || 
|-id=790 bgcolor=#fefefe
| 232790 ||  || — || September 8, 2004 || Socorro || LINEAR || — || align=right | 1.3 km || 
|-id=791 bgcolor=#E9E9E9
| 232791 ||  || — || September 8, 2004 || Socorro || LINEAR || — || align=right | 2.5 km || 
|-id=792 bgcolor=#fefefe
| 232792 ||  || — || September 8, 2004 || Palomar || NEAT || — || align=right | 1.1 km || 
|-id=793 bgcolor=#fefefe
| 232793 ||  || — || September 8, 2004 || Socorro || LINEAR || — || align=right | 1.1 km || 
|-id=794 bgcolor=#E9E9E9
| 232794 ||  || — || September 8, 2004 || Socorro || LINEAR || — || align=right | 2.9 km || 
|-id=795 bgcolor=#fefefe
| 232795 ||  || — || September 8, 2004 || Socorro || LINEAR || V || align=right data-sort-value="0.98" | 980 m || 
|-id=796 bgcolor=#E9E9E9
| 232796 ||  || — || September 5, 2004 || Siding Spring || SSS || — || align=right | 1.8 km || 
|-id=797 bgcolor=#E9E9E9
| 232797 ||  || — || September 10, 2004 || Socorro || LINEAR || — || align=right | 1.4 km || 
|-id=798 bgcolor=#E9E9E9
| 232798 ||  || — || September 10, 2004 || Socorro || LINEAR || — || align=right | 2.0 km || 
|-id=799 bgcolor=#fefefe
| 232799 ||  || — || September 10, 2004 || Socorro || LINEAR || ERI || align=right | 2.0 km || 
|-id=800 bgcolor=#fefefe
| 232800 ||  || — || September 10, 2004 || Socorro || LINEAR || — || align=right | 1.3 km || 
|}

232801–232900 

|-bgcolor=#E9E9E9
| 232801 ||  || — || September 10, 2004 || Socorro || LINEAR || — || align=right | 1.9 km || 
|-id=802 bgcolor=#E9E9E9
| 232802 ||  || — || September 10, 2004 || Socorro || LINEAR || — || align=right | 3.7 km || 
|-id=803 bgcolor=#E9E9E9
| 232803 ||  || — || September 11, 2004 || Socorro || LINEAR || — || align=right | 2.0 km || 
|-id=804 bgcolor=#E9E9E9
| 232804 ||  || — || September 11, 2004 || Socorro || LINEAR || JUN || align=right | 1.3 km || 
|-id=805 bgcolor=#E9E9E9
| 232805 ||  || — || September 11, 2004 || Socorro || LINEAR || — || align=right | 2.8 km || 
|-id=806 bgcolor=#E9E9E9
| 232806 ||  || — || September 9, 2004 || Kitt Peak || Spacewatch || — || align=right | 1.6 km || 
|-id=807 bgcolor=#fefefe
| 232807 ||  || — || September 9, 2004 || Kitt Peak || Spacewatch || — || align=right | 1.3 km || 
|-id=808 bgcolor=#E9E9E9
| 232808 ||  || — || September 12, 2004 || Kitt Peak || Spacewatch || — || align=right | 1.3 km || 
|-id=809 bgcolor=#E9E9E9
| 232809 ||  || — || September 9, 2004 || Anderson Mesa || LONEOS || — || align=right | 3.2 km || 
|-id=810 bgcolor=#fefefe
| 232810 ||  || — || September 11, 2004 || Kitt Peak || Spacewatch || ERI || align=right | 2.5 km || 
|-id=811 bgcolor=#fefefe
| 232811 ||  || — || September 11, 2004 || Kitt Peak || Spacewatch || NYS || align=right data-sort-value="0.93" | 930 m || 
|-id=812 bgcolor=#fefefe
| 232812 ||  || — || September 11, 2004 || Kitt Peak || Spacewatch || — || align=right | 1.0 km || 
|-id=813 bgcolor=#E9E9E9
| 232813 ||  || — || September 12, 2004 || Socorro || LINEAR || — || align=right | 1.1 km || 
|-id=814 bgcolor=#E9E9E9
| 232814 ||  || — || September 13, 2004 || Palomar || NEAT || — || align=right | 1.2 km || 
|-id=815 bgcolor=#E9E9E9
| 232815 ||  || — || September 15, 2004 || Anderson Mesa || LONEOS || — || align=right | 2.8 km || 
|-id=816 bgcolor=#E9E9E9
| 232816 ||  || — || September 15, 2004 || Kitt Peak || Spacewatch || PAD || align=right | 3.2 km || 
|-id=817 bgcolor=#E9E9E9
| 232817 ||  || — || September 13, 2004 || Socorro || LINEAR || — || align=right | 2.2 km || 
|-id=818 bgcolor=#E9E9E9
| 232818 ||  || — || September 13, 2004 || Socorro || LINEAR || — || align=right | 5.1 km || 
|-id=819 bgcolor=#E9E9E9
| 232819 ||  || — || September 13, 2004 || Socorro || LINEAR || — || align=right | 4.1 km || 
|-id=820 bgcolor=#fefefe
| 232820 ||  || — || September 15, 2004 || Kitt Peak || Spacewatch || ERI || align=right | 1.8 km || 
|-id=821 bgcolor=#E9E9E9
| 232821 ||  || — || September 7, 2004 || Socorro || LINEAR || — || align=right | 3.8 km || 
|-id=822 bgcolor=#fefefe
| 232822 ||  || — || September 8, 2004 || Socorro || LINEAR || — || align=right data-sort-value="0.93" | 930 m || 
|-id=823 bgcolor=#E9E9E9
| 232823 ||  || — || September 17, 2004 || Kitt Peak || Spacewatch || JUN || align=right | 1.2 km || 
|-id=824 bgcolor=#E9E9E9
| 232824 ||  || — || September 22, 2004 || Desert Eagle || W. K. Y. Yeung || — || align=right | 1.2 km || 
|-id=825 bgcolor=#E9E9E9
| 232825 ||  || — || September 17, 2004 || Socorro || LINEAR || — || align=right | 3.2 km || 
|-id=826 bgcolor=#E9E9E9
| 232826 ||  || — || September 22, 2004 || Socorro || LINEAR || PAD || align=right | 4.4 km || 
|-id=827 bgcolor=#E9E9E9
| 232827 ||  || — || September 17, 2004 || Socorro || LINEAR || — || align=right | 4.4 km || 
|-id=828 bgcolor=#d6d6d6
| 232828 ||  || — || September 18, 2004 || Socorro || LINEAR || — || align=right | 4.3 km || 
|-id=829 bgcolor=#d6d6d6
| 232829 ||  || — || September 18, 2004 || Socorro || LINEAR || 615 || align=right | 2.0 km || 
|-id=830 bgcolor=#fefefe
| 232830 ||  || — || October 3, 2004 || Goodricke-Pigott || R. A. Tucker || NYS || align=right data-sort-value="0.87" | 870 m || 
|-id=831 bgcolor=#fefefe
| 232831 ||  || — || October 4, 2004 || Kitt Peak || Spacewatch || — || align=right | 1.3 km || 
|-id=832 bgcolor=#E9E9E9
| 232832 ||  || — || October 5, 2004 || Socorro || LINEAR || — || align=right | 2.5 km || 
|-id=833 bgcolor=#E9E9E9
| 232833 ||  || — || October 11, 2004 || Kitt Peak || Spacewatch || — || align=right | 1.0 km || 
|-id=834 bgcolor=#fefefe
| 232834 ||  || — || October 4, 2004 || Kitt Peak || Spacewatch || MAS || align=right | 1.0 km || 
|-id=835 bgcolor=#E9E9E9
| 232835 ||  || — || October 4, 2004 || Kitt Peak || Spacewatch || — || align=right | 1.2 km || 
|-id=836 bgcolor=#E9E9E9
| 232836 ||  || — || October 4, 2004 || Kitt Peak || Spacewatch || HEN || align=right | 1.2 km || 
|-id=837 bgcolor=#E9E9E9
| 232837 ||  || — || October 4, 2004 || Kitt Peak || Spacewatch || — || align=right | 2.6 km || 
|-id=838 bgcolor=#E9E9E9
| 232838 ||  || — || October 4, 2004 || Kitt Peak || Spacewatch || — || align=right | 1.3 km || 
|-id=839 bgcolor=#E9E9E9
| 232839 ||  || — || October 5, 2004 || Anderson Mesa || LONEOS || RAF || align=right | 1.2 km || 
|-id=840 bgcolor=#E9E9E9
| 232840 ||  || — || October 5, 2004 || Palomar || NEAT || — || align=right | 1.2 km || 
|-id=841 bgcolor=#E9E9E9
| 232841 ||  || — || October 5, 2004 || Anderson Mesa || LONEOS || — || align=right | 3.4 km || 
|-id=842 bgcolor=#fefefe
| 232842 ||  || — || October 5, 2004 || Palomar || NEAT || — || align=right | 1.4 km || 
|-id=843 bgcolor=#E9E9E9
| 232843 ||  || — || October 7, 2004 || Socorro || LINEAR || — || align=right | 3.6 km || 
|-id=844 bgcolor=#E9E9E9
| 232844 ||  || — || October 5, 2004 || Kitt Peak || Spacewatch || — || align=right | 1.5 km || 
|-id=845 bgcolor=#E9E9E9
| 232845 ||  || — || October 8, 2004 || Anderson Mesa || LONEOS || HNA || align=right | 3.3 km || 
|-id=846 bgcolor=#E9E9E9
| 232846 ||  || — || October 8, 2004 || Anderson Mesa || LONEOS || — || align=right | 1.5 km || 
|-id=847 bgcolor=#fefefe
| 232847 ||  || — || October 4, 2004 || Kitt Peak || Spacewatch || — || align=right | 1.2 km || 
|-id=848 bgcolor=#fefefe
| 232848 ||  || — || October 6, 2004 || Kitt Peak || Spacewatch || MAS || align=right data-sort-value="0.95" | 950 m || 
|-id=849 bgcolor=#d6d6d6
| 232849 ||  || — || October 6, 2004 || Kitt Peak || Spacewatch || — || align=right | 3.9 km || 
|-id=850 bgcolor=#E9E9E9
| 232850 ||  || — || October 6, 2004 || Kitt Peak || Spacewatch || — || align=right | 1.5 km || 
|-id=851 bgcolor=#fefefe
| 232851 ||  || — || October 7, 2004 || Kitt Peak || Spacewatch || — || align=right | 3.0 km || 
|-id=852 bgcolor=#fefefe
| 232852 ||  || — || October 7, 2004 || Kitt Peak || Spacewatch || NYS || align=right | 1.0 km || 
|-id=853 bgcolor=#E9E9E9
| 232853 ||  || — || October 7, 2004 || Socorro || LINEAR || — || align=right | 5.8 km || 
|-id=854 bgcolor=#fefefe
| 232854 ||  || — || October 7, 2004 || Kitt Peak || Spacewatch || — || align=right | 2.1 km || 
|-id=855 bgcolor=#E9E9E9
| 232855 ||  || — || October 7, 2004 || Kitt Peak || Spacewatch || — || align=right | 2.0 km || 
|-id=856 bgcolor=#E9E9E9
| 232856 ||  || — || October 7, 2004 || Kitt Peak || Spacewatch || — || align=right | 1.1 km || 
|-id=857 bgcolor=#E9E9E9
| 232857 ||  || — || October 5, 2004 || Kitt Peak || Spacewatch || HOF || align=right | 3.4 km || 
|-id=858 bgcolor=#E9E9E9
| 232858 ||  || — || October 7, 2004 || Socorro || LINEAR || — || align=right | 3.5 km || 
|-id=859 bgcolor=#E9E9E9
| 232859 ||  || — || October 6, 2004 || Kitt Peak || Spacewatch || — || align=right | 1.7 km || 
|-id=860 bgcolor=#E9E9E9
| 232860 ||  || — || October 9, 2004 || Kitt Peak || Spacewatch || — || align=right | 1.5 km || 
|-id=861 bgcolor=#E9E9E9
| 232861 ||  || — || October 9, 2004 || Kitt Peak || Spacewatch || — || align=right | 2.4 km || 
|-id=862 bgcolor=#E9E9E9
| 232862 ||  || — || October 9, 2004 || Kitt Peak || Spacewatch || — || align=right | 2.2 km || 
|-id=863 bgcolor=#E9E9E9
| 232863 ||  || — || October 10, 2004 || Kitt Peak || Spacewatch || HEN || align=right | 1.2 km || 
|-id=864 bgcolor=#fefefe
| 232864 ||  || — || October 8, 2004 || Kitt Peak || Spacewatch || EUT || align=right data-sort-value="0.95" | 950 m || 
|-id=865 bgcolor=#E9E9E9
| 232865 ||  || — || October 10, 2004 || Kitt Peak || Spacewatch || — || align=right | 2.2 km || 
|-id=866 bgcolor=#E9E9E9
| 232866 ||  || — || October 10, 2004 || Kitt Peak || Spacewatch || MRX || align=right | 1.2 km || 
|-id=867 bgcolor=#E9E9E9
| 232867 ||  || — || October 15, 2004 || Kitt Peak || Spacewatch || — || align=right | 1.3 km || 
|-id=868 bgcolor=#E9E9E9
| 232868 ||  || — || October 11, 2004 || Kitt Peak || M. W. Buie || — || align=right | 1.9 km || 
|-id=869 bgcolor=#E9E9E9
| 232869 ||  || — || October 9, 2004 || Kitt Peak || Spacewatch || — || align=right | 1.0 km || 
|-id=870 bgcolor=#fefefe
| 232870 ||  || — || October 19, 2004 || Socorro || LINEAR || H || align=right | 1.5 km || 
|-id=871 bgcolor=#E9E9E9
| 232871 ||  || — || November 3, 2004 || Kitt Peak || Spacewatch || — || align=right | 2.2 km || 
|-id=872 bgcolor=#E9E9E9
| 232872 ||  || — || November 4, 2004 || Catalina || CSS || — || align=right | 1.6 km || 
|-id=873 bgcolor=#E9E9E9
| 232873 ||  || — || November 2, 2004 || Palomar || NEAT || — || align=right | 2.2 km || 
|-id=874 bgcolor=#E9E9E9
| 232874 ||  || — || November 7, 2004 || Socorro || LINEAR || — || align=right | 3.4 km || 
|-id=875 bgcolor=#E9E9E9
| 232875 ||  || — || November 3, 2004 || Kitt Peak || Spacewatch || — || align=right | 2.1 km || 
|-id=876 bgcolor=#E9E9E9
| 232876 ||  || — || November 4, 2004 || Kitt Peak || Spacewatch || HEN || align=right | 1.1 km || 
|-id=877 bgcolor=#E9E9E9
| 232877 ||  || — || November 4, 2004 || Kitt Peak || Spacewatch || — || align=right | 2.7 km || 
|-id=878 bgcolor=#E9E9E9
| 232878 ||  || — || November 4, 2004 || Kitt Peak || Spacewatch || HNS || align=right | 2.6 km || 
|-id=879 bgcolor=#E9E9E9
| 232879 ||  || — || November 4, 2004 || Catalina || CSS || — || align=right | 3.0 km || 
|-id=880 bgcolor=#d6d6d6
| 232880 ||  || — || November 9, 2004 || Catalina || CSS || — || align=right | 3.2 km || 
|-id=881 bgcolor=#E9E9E9
| 232881 ||  || — || November 9, 2004 || Catalina || CSS || — || align=right | 2.1 km || 
|-id=882 bgcolor=#E9E9E9
| 232882 ||  || — || November 12, 2004 || Catalina || CSS || AGN || align=right | 2.0 km || 
|-id=883 bgcolor=#E9E9E9
| 232883 ||  || — || November 12, 2004 || Catalina || CSS || — || align=right | 1.6 km || 
|-id=884 bgcolor=#E9E9E9
| 232884 ||  || — || November 11, 2004 || Kitt Peak || Spacewatch || — || align=right | 1.8 km || 
|-id=885 bgcolor=#E9E9E9
| 232885 ||  || — || December 4, 2004 || Eskridge || G. Hug || — || align=right | 2.8 km || 
|-id=886 bgcolor=#E9E9E9
| 232886 ||  || — || December 2, 2004 || Palomar || NEAT || — || align=right | 1.8 km || 
|-id=887 bgcolor=#E9E9E9
| 232887 ||  || — || December 2, 2004 || Catalina || CSS || — || align=right | 2.8 km || 
|-id=888 bgcolor=#E9E9E9
| 232888 ||  || — || December 3, 2004 || Kitt Peak || Spacewatch || — || align=right | 3.6 km || 
|-id=889 bgcolor=#d6d6d6
| 232889 ||  || — || December 8, 2004 || Socorro || LINEAR || — || align=right | 5.7 km || 
|-id=890 bgcolor=#d6d6d6
| 232890 ||  || — || December 8, 2004 || Socorro || LINEAR || — || align=right | 3.4 km || 
|-id=891 bgcolor=#E9E9E9
| 232891 ||  || — || December 9, 2004 || Catalina || CSS || KON || align=right | 4.6 km || 
|-id=892 bgcolor=#E9E9E9
| 232892 ||  || — || December 10, 2004 || Socorro || LINEAR || — || align=right | 1.5 km || 
|-id=893 bgcolor=#d6d6d6
| 232893 ||  || — || December 8, 2004 || Socorro || LINEAR || — || align=right | 5.2 km || 
|-id=894 bgcolor=#E9E9E9
| 232894 ||  || — || December 10, 2004 || Socorro || LINEAR || — || align=right | 2.2 km || 
|-id=895 bgcolor=#d6d6d6
| 232895 ||  || — || December 8, 2004 || Socorro || LINEAR || — || align=right | 4.6 km || 
|-id=896 bgcolor=#E9E9E9
| 232896 ||  || — || December 10, 2004 || Kitt Peak || Spacewatch || — || align=right | 2.6 km || 
|-id=897 bgcolor=#E9E9E9
| 232897 ||  || — || December 8, 2004 || Socorro || LINEAR || — || align=right | 2.0 km || 
|-id=898 bgcolor=#d6d6d6
| 232898 ||  || — || December 11, 2004 || Campo Imperatore || CINEOS || — || align=right | 5.9 km || 
|-id=899 bgcolor=#E9E9E9
| 232899 ||  || — || December 11, 2004 || Kitt Peak || Spacewatch || — || align=right | 3.3 km || 
|-id=900 bgcolor=#E9E9E9
| 232900 ||  || — || December 14, 2004 || Junk Bond || Junk Bond Obs. || — || align=right | 3.0 km || 
|}

232901–233000 

|-bgcolor=#d6d6d6
| 232901 ||  || — || December 10, 2004 || Anderson Mesa || LONEOS || — || align=right | 3.0 km || 
|-id=902 bgcolor=#E9E9E9
| 232902 ||  || — || December 12, 2004 || Vail-Jarnac || Jarnac Obs. || DOR || align=right | 3.5 km || 
|-id=903 bgcolor=#E9E9E9
| 232903 ||  || — || December 9, 2004 || Catalina || CSS || — || align=right | 1.8 km || 
|-id=904 bgcolor=#d6d6d6
| 232904 ||  || — || December 11, 2004 || Socorro || LINEAR || ALA || align=right | 6.2 km || 
|-id=905 bgcolor=#E9E9E9
| 232905 ||  || — || December 14, 2004 || Catalina || CSS || JUN || align=right | 1.9 km || 
|-id=906 bgcolor=#d6d6d6
| 232906 ||  || — || December 14, 2004 || Socorro || LINEAR || — || align=right | 3.0 km || 
|-id=907 bgcolor=#d6d6d6
| 232907 ||  || — || December 15, 2004 || Kitt Peak || Spacewatch || TRE || align=right | 4.5 km || 
|-id=908 bgcolor=#E9E9E9
| 232908 ||  || — || December 15, 2004 || Socorro || LINEAR || — || align=right | 2.6 km || 
|-id=909 bgcolor=#E9E9E9
| 232909 ||  || — || December 15, 2004 || Socorro || LINEAR || — || align=right | 1.9 km || 
|-id=910 bgcolor=#E9E9E9
| 232910 ||  || — || December 15, 2004 || Socorro || LINEAR || — || align=right | 3.1 km || 
|-id=911 bgcolor=#E9E9E9
| 232911 ||  || — || December 1, 2004 || Catalina || CSS || GEF || align=right | 2.2 km || 
|-id=912 bgcolor=#E9E9E9
| 232912 ||  || — || December 16, 2004 || Jarnac || Jarnac Obs. || AST || align=right | 3.0 km || 
|-id=913 bgcolor=#d6d6d6
| 232913 ||  || — || December 16, 2004 || Catalina || CSS || — || align=right | 3.8 km || 
|-id=914 bgcolor=#E9E9E9
| 232914 ||  || — || December 18, 2004 || Mount Lemmon || Mount Lemmon Survey || HOF || align=right | 4.7 km || 
|-id=915 bgcolor=#d6d6d6
| 232915 ||  || — || December 18, 2004 || Mount Lemmon || Mount Lemmon Survey || — || align=right | 2.7 km || 
|-id=916 bgcolor=#d6d6d6
| 232916 ||  || — || December 19, 2004 || Mount Lemmon || Mount Lemmon Survey || VER || align=right | 4.0 km || 
|-id=917 bgcolor=#d6d6d6
| 232917 ||  || — || December 21, 2004 || Catalina || CSS || — || align=right | 4.6 km || 
|-id=918 bgcolor=#d6d6d6
| 232918 ||  || — || January 6, 2005 || Catalina || CSS || — || align=right | 6.0 km || 
|-id=919 bgcolor=#E9E9E9
| 232919 ||  || — || January 6, 2005 || Catalina || CSS || EUN || align=right | 1.9 km || 
|-id=920 bgcolor=#d6d6d6
| 232920 ||  || — || January 6, 2005 || Socorro || LINEAR || — || align=right | 4.2 km || 
|-id=921 bgcolor=#d6d6d6
| 232921 ||  || — || January 6, 2005 || Catalina || CSS || — || align=right | 3.5 km || 
|-id=922 bgcolor=#fefefe
| 232922 ||  || — || January 13, 2005 || Kitt Peak || Spacewatch || ERI || align=right | 3.6 km || 
|-id=923 bgcolor=#E9E9E9
| 232923 Adalovelace ||  ||  || January 15, 2005 || Kleť || KLENOT || — || align=right | 2.4 km || 
|-id=924 bgcolor=#E9E9E9
| 232924 ||  || — || January 9, 2005 || Catalina || CSS || — || align=right | 3.8 km || 
|-id=925 bgcolor=#d6d6d6
| 232925 ||  || — || January 9, 2005 || Catalina || CSS || — || align=right | 2.6 km || 
|-id=926 bgcolor=#d6d6d6
| 232926 ||  || — || January 13, 2005 || Kitt Peak || Spacewatch || HYG || align=right | 5.1 km || 
|-id=927 bgcolor=#E9E9E9
| 232927 ||  || — || January 13, 2005 || Socorro || LINEAR || WAT || align=right | 2.9 km || 
|-id=928 bgcolor=#E9E9E9
| 232928 ||  || — || January 15, 2005 || Socorro || LINEAR || — || align=right | 3.1 km || 
|-id=929 bgcolor=#E9E9E9
| 232929 ||  || — || January 13, 2005 || Kitt Peak || Spacewatch || HEN || align=right | 1.4 km || 
|-id=930 bgcolor=#d6d6d6
| 232930 ||  || — || January 13, 2005 || Socorro || LINEAR || — || align=right | 5.8 km || 
|-id=931 bgcolor=#d6d6d6
| 232931 ||  || — || January 13, 2005 || Catalina || CSS || — || align=right | 5.7 km || 
|-id=932 bgcolor=#d6d6d6
| 232932 ||  || — || January 13, 2005 || Kitt Peak || Spacewatch || — || align=right | 4.2 km || 
|-id=933 bgcolor=#d6d6d6
| 232933 ||  || — || January 15, 2005 || Kitt Peak || Spacewatch || KOR || align=right | 1.8 km || 
|-id=934 bgcolor=#d6d6d6
| 232934 ||  || — || January 15, 2005 || Socorro || LINEAR || — || align=right | 4.9 km || 
|-id=935 bgcolor=#d6d6d6
| 232935 ||  || — || January 13, 2005 || Kitt Peak || Spacewatch || BRA || align=right | 1.7 km || 
|-id=936 bgcolor=#d6d6d6
| 232936 ||  || — || January 19, 2005 || Wrightwood || J. W. Young || — || align=right | 3.9 km || 
|-id=937 bgcolor=#d6d6d6
| 232937 ||  || — || January 17, 2005 || Kitt Peak || Spacewatch || HYG || align=right | 4.6 km || 
|-id=938 bgcolor=#d6d6d6
| 232938 ||  || — || January 31, 2005 || Mayhill || A. Lowe || — || align=right | 4.5 km || 
|-id=939 bgcolor=#E9E9E9
| 232939 ||  || — || January 16, 2005 || Mauna Kea || C. Veillet || — || align=right | 2.5 km || 
|-id=940 bgcolor=#E9E9E9
| 232940 ||  || — || January 16, 2005 || Mauna Kea || C. Veillet || AGN || align=right | 1.6 km || 
|-id=941 bgcolor=#d6d6d6
| 232941 ||  || — || February 1, 2005 || Kitt Peak || Spacewatch || NAE || align=right | 4.0 km || 
|-id=942 bgcolor=#d6d6d6
| 232942 ||  || — || February 2, 2005 || Catalina || CSS || — || align=right | 2.5 km || 
|-id=943 bgcolor=#d6d6d6
| 232943 ||  || — || February 1, 2005 || Kitt Peak || Spacewatch || KOR || align=right | 1.9 km || 
|-id=944 bgcolor=#d6d6d6
| 232944 ||  || — || February 2, 2005 || Kitt Peak || Spacewatch || 7:4 || align=right | 7.0 km || 
|-id=945 bgcolor=#d6d6d6
| 232945 ||  || — || February 2, 2005 || Kitt Peak || Spacewatch || — || align=right | 2.8 km || 
|-id=946 bgcolor=#d6d6d6
| 232946 ||  || — || February 2, 2005 || Catalina || CSS || — || align=right | 2.8 km || 
|-id=947 bgcolor=#d6d6d6
| 232947 ||  || — || March 1, 2005 || Kitt Peak || Spacewatch || — || align=right | 4.1 km || 
|-id=948 bgcolor=#d6d6d6
| 232948 ||  || — || March 1, 2005 || Kitt Peak || Spacewatch || EOS || align=right | 2.9 km || 
|-id=949 bgcolor=#d6d6d6
| 232949 Muhina ||  ||  || March 1, 2005 || Marly || Naef Obs. || — || align=right | 3.2 km || 
|-id=950 bgcolor=#d6d6d6
| 232950 ||  || — || March 2, 2005 || Kitt Peak || Spacewatch || HYG || align=right | 3.6 km || 
|-id=951 bgcolor=#d6d6d6
| 232951 ||  || — || March 2, 2005 || Kitt Peak || Spacewatch || TIR || align=right | 4.2 km || 
|-id=952 bgcolor=#d6d6d6
| 232952 ||  || — || March 3, 2005 || Kitt Peak || Spacewatch || — || align=right | 4.1 km || 
|-id=953 bgcolor=#d6d6d6
| 232953 ||  || — || March 3, 2005 || Kitt Peak || Spacewatch || THM || align=right | 3.1 km || 
|-id=954 bgcolor=#d6d6d6
| 232954 ||  || — || March 3, 2005 || Kitt Peak || Spacewatch || THM || align=right | 2.6 km || 
|-id=955 bgcolor=#d6d6d6
| 232955 ||  || — || March 3, 2005 || Kitt Peak || Spacewatch || — || align=right | 4.4 km || 
|-id=956 bgcolor=#d6d6d6
| 232956 ||  || — || March 3, 2005 || Catalina || CSS || CRO || align=right | 5.6 km || 
|-id=957 bgcolor=#E9E9E9
| 232957 ||  || — || March 3, 2005 || Catalina || CSS || CLO || align=right | 3.2 km || 
|-id=958 bgcolor=#d6d6d6
| 232958 ||  || — || March 3, 2005 || Catalina || CSS || — || align=right | 4.7 km || 
|-id=959 bgcolor=#E9E9E9
| 232959 ||  || — || March 3, 2005 || Catalina || CSS || — || align=right | 4.0 km || 
|-id=960 bgcolor=#d6d6d6
| 232960 ||  || — || March 4, 2005 || Catalina || CSS || URS || align=right | 5.3 km || 
|-id=961 bgcolor=#d6d6d6
| 232961 ||  || — || March 4, 2005 || Socorro || LINEAR || — || align=right | 5.4 km || 
|-id=962 bgcolor=#fefefe
| 232962 ||  || — || March 4, 2005 || Kleť || Kleť Obs. || H || align=right data-sort-value="0.87" | 870 m || 
|-id=963 bgcolor=#d6d6d6
| 232963 ||  || — || March 3, 2005 || Catalina || CSS || — || align=right | 3.2 km || 
|-id=964 bgcolor=#d6d6d6
| 232964 ||  || — || March 3, 2005 || Catalina || CSS || — || align=right | 4.1 km || 
|-id=965 bgcolor=#E9E9E9
| 232965 ||  || — || March 4, 2005 || Catalina || CSS || — || align=right | 2.3 km || 
|-id=966 bgcolor=#d6d6d6
| 232966 ||  || — || March 4, 2005 || Mount Lemmon || Mount Lemmon Survey || — || align=right | 4.9 km || 
|-id=967 bgcolor=#d6d6d6
| 232967 ||  || — || March 4, 2005 || Junk Bond || Junk Bond Obs. || CHA || align=right | 2.1 km || 
|-id=968 bgcolor=#E9E9E9
| 232968 ||  || — || March 3, 2005 || Kitt Peak || Spacewatch || — || align=right | 1.0 km || 
|-id=969 bgcolor=#d6d6d6
| 232969 ||  || — || March 4, 2005 || Catalina || CSS || TIR || align=right | 5.0 km || 
|-id=970 bgcolor=#d6d6d6
| 232970 ||  || — || March 4, 2005 || Catalina || CSS || — || align=right | 4.4 km || 
|-id=971 bgcolor=#d6d6d6
| 232971 ||  || — || March 4, 2005 || Catalina || CSS || EUP || align=right | 7.0 km || 
|-id=972 bgcolor=#E9E9E9
| 232972 ||  || — || March 8, 2005 || Anderson Mesa || LONEOS || — || align=right | 3.1 km || 
|-id=973 bgcolor=#d6d6d6
| 232973 ||  || — || March 8, 2005 || Anderson Mesa || LONEOS || — || align=right | 4.0 km || 
|-id=974 bgcolor=#d6d6d6
| 232974 ||  || — || March 3, 2005 || Catalina || CSS || EOS || align=right | 2.8 km || 
|-id=975 bgcolor=#d6d6d6
| 232975 ||  || — || March 3, 2005 || Catalina || CSS || VER || align=right | 5.4 km || 
|-id=976 bgcolor=#d6d6d6
| 232976 ||  || — || March 4, 2005 || Kitt Peak || Spacewatch || CHA || align=right | 2.7 km || 
|-id=977 bgcolor=#d6d6d6
| 232977 ||  || — || March 4, 2005 || Kitt Peak || Spacewatch || — || align=right | 4.6 km || 
|-id=978 bgcolor=#d6d6d6
| 232978 ||  || — || March 7, 2005 || Socorro || LINEAR || — || align=right | 2.9 km || 
|-id=979 bgcolor=#d6d6d6
| 232979 ||  || — || March 8, 2005 || Anderson Mesa || LONEOS || — || align=right | 2.7 km || 
|-id=980 bgcolor=#d6d6d6
| 232980 ||  || — || March 8, 2005 || Anderson Mesa || LONEOS || — || align=right | 3.2 km || 
|-id=981 bgcolor=#d6d6d6
| 232981 ||  || — || March 8, 2005 || Mount Lemmon || Mount Lemmon Survey || — || align=right | 2.9 km || 
|-id=982 bgcolor=#d6d6d6
| 232982 ||  || — || March 9, 2005 || Socorro || LINEAR || EOS || align=right | 2.8 km || 
|-id=983 bgcolor=#d6d6d6
| 232983 ||  || — || March 9, 2005 || Anderson Mesa || LONEOS || — || align=right | 2.9 km || 
|-id=984 bgcolor=#E9E9E9
| 232984 ||  || — || March 9, 2005 || Kitt Peak || Spacewatch || — || align=right | 3.8 km || 
|-id=985 bgcolor=#d6d6d6
| 232985 ||  || — || March 9, 2005 || Mount Lemmon || Mount Lemmon Survey || — || align=right | 4.9 km || 
|-id=986 bgcolor=#d6d6d6
| 232986 ||  || — || March 9, 2005 || Anderson Mesa || LONEOS || — || align=right | 5.2 km || 
|-id=987 bgcolor=#d6d6d6
| 232987 ||  || — || March 9, 2005 || Socorro || LINEAR || — || align=right | 5.7 km || 
|-id=988 bgcolor=#d6d6d6
| 232988 ||  || — || March 10, 2005 || Catalina || CSS || — || align=right | 3.7 km || 
|-id=989 bgcolor=#d6d6d6
| 232989 ||  || — || March 10, 2005 || Mount Lemmon || Mount Lemmon Survey || HYG || align=right | 3.4 km || 
|-id=990 bgcolor=#d6d6d6
| 232990 ||  || — || March 10, 2005 || Mount Lemmon || Mount Lemmon Survey || THM || align=right | 3.1 km || 
|-id=991 bgcolor=#d6d6d6
| 232991 ||  || — || March 10, 2005 || Kitt Peak || Spacewatch || THM || align=right | 3.2 km || 
|-id=992 bgcolor=#d6d6d6
| 232992 ||  || — || March 8, 2005 || Mount Lemmon || Mount Lemmon Survey || EOS || align=right | 2.9 km || 
|-id=993 bgcolor=#d6d6d6
| 232993 ||  || — || March 9, 2005 || Mount Lemmon || Mount Lemmon Survey || — || align=right | 3.3 km || 
|-id=994 bgcolor=#d6d6d6
| 232994 ||  || — || March 9, 2005 || Mount Lemmon || Mount Lemmon Survey || — || align=right | 3.6 km || 
|-id=995 bgcolor=#d6d6d6
| 232995 ||  || — || March 9, 2005 || Mount Lemmon || Mount Lemmon Survey || TEL || align=right | 2.0 km || 
|-id=996 bgcolor=#d6d6d6
| 232996 ||  || — || March 10, 2005 || Mount Lemmon || Mount Lemmon Survey || — || align=right | 3.6 km || 
|-id=997 bgcolor=#d6d6d6
| 232997 ||  || — || March 8, 2005 || Kitt Peak || Spacewatch || — || align=right | 2.4 km || 
|-id=998 bgcolor=#d6d6d6
| 232998 ||  || — || March 8, 2005 || Mount Lemmon || Mount Lemmon Survey || — || align=right | 2.7 km || 
|-id=999 bgcolor=#d6d6d6
| 232999 ||  || — || March 9, 2005 || Kitt Peak || Spacewatch || — || align=right | 3.2 km || 
|-id=000 bgcolor=#d6d6d6
| 233000 ||  || — || March 9, 2005 || Socorro || LINEAR || — || align=right | 3.4 km || 
|}

References

External links 
 Discovery Circumstances: Numbered Minor Planets (230001)–(235000) (IAU Minor Planet Center)

0232